= Dioscorus of Aphrodito =

Ancient Greek poet

- Born: Dioskoros c. AD 520; Aphrodito, Egypt
- Died: c. AD 585 (aged 65 years); Aphrodito, Egypt
- Citizenship: Egyptian
- Occupations: Poet, lawyer, village administrator
- Relatives: Apollos (father)
- Writing career
- Notable work: Hymn to St. Theodosius (Poem 17)
- Movement: Allegory

Flavius Dioscorus (Greek: Φλαύϊος Διόσκορος, romanized: Flavios Dioskoros) lived during the 6th century AD in the village of Aphrodito, Egypt, and therefore is called by modern scholars Dioscorus of Aphrodito. Although he was an Egyptian, he composed poetry in Greek, the lingua franca of the Eastern Mediterranean since the Hellenistic period. The manuscripts, which contain his corrections and revisions, were discovered on papyrus in 1905, and are now held in museums and libraries around the world. Dioscorus was also occupied in legal work, and legal documents and drafts involving him, his family, Aphroditans, and others were discovered along with his poetry. As an administrator of the village of Aphrodito, he composed petitions on behalf of its citizens, which are unique for their poetic and religious qualities. Dioscorus was a Christian (a Copt) and lived in a religiously active environment. The collection of Greek and Coptic papyri associated with Dioscorus and Aphrodito is one of the most important finds in the history of papyrology and has shed considerable light on the law and society of Byzantine Egypt. The papyri are also considered significant because of their mention of Coptic workers and artists dispatched to the Levant and Arabia to work on early Umayyad architectural projects.

== Papyrus ==
The papyri of Dioscorus were discovered by accident in July 1905 in the village of Kom Ashkaw (also called Kom Ishgau, Kom Ishqaw, etc.), which was built above the ancient site of Aphrodito. An inhabitant was renovating his home when a wall collapsed and revealed a chasm below. Papyrus rolls and fragments were seen in the crevice, but by the time the Antiquities Service was notified and arrived, most of the papyrus was gone. During subsequent excavations, a large jar filled with papyrus was discovered in a Roman-style house. Important fragments of Athenian Comedy, both Old and New, were discovered among these papyri, including fragments of the famous comedy writer Menander. There were also fragments of Homer's Iliad and other literary works and reference works.

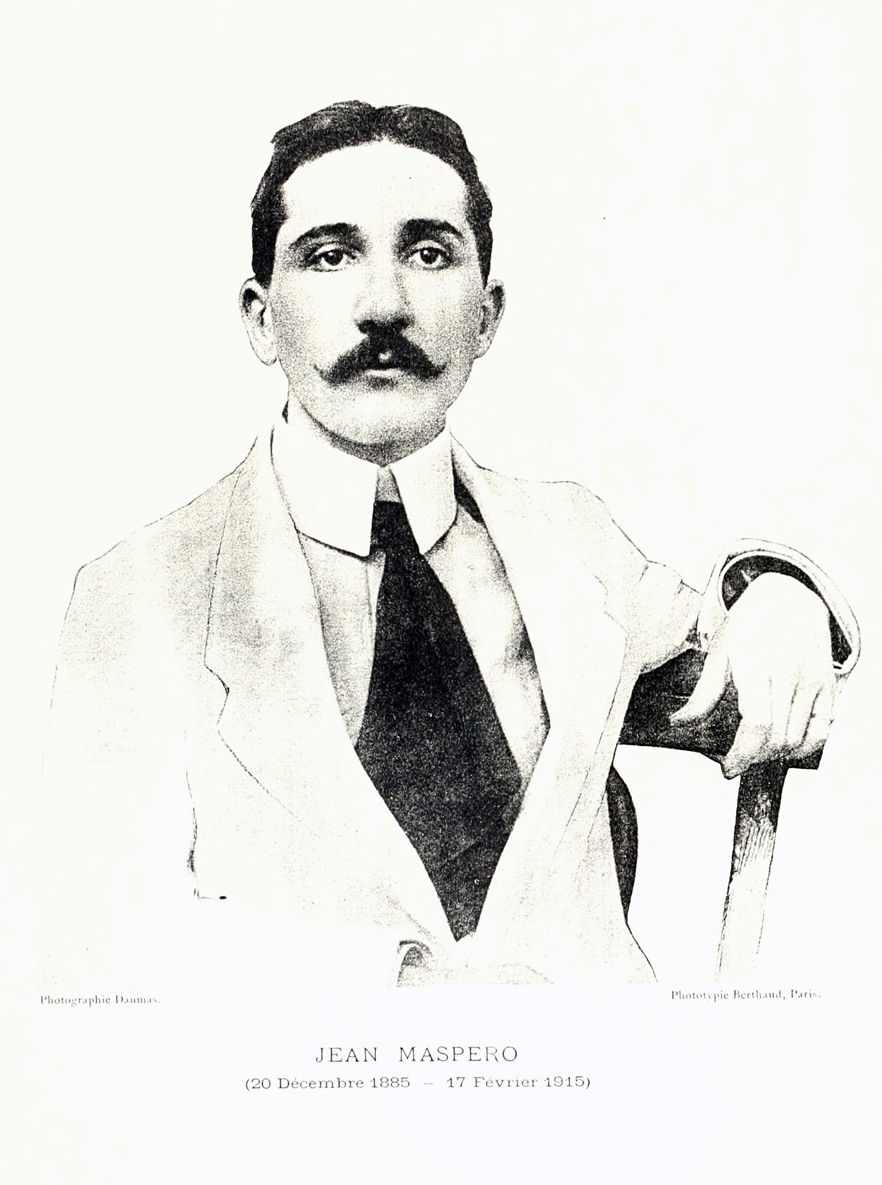
Jean Maspero, editor of the first collection of Dioscorian poems (1911)

Most importantly, the excavator Gustave Lefebvre unearthed an archive of sixth-century legal, business, and personal papers, and original poetry. These were turned over to the young scholar Jean Maspero, son of the Director of the Antiquities Service of Egypt, who edited and published the documents and poems in several journal articles and two volumes of the Catalogue général des antiquités égyptiennes du Musée du Caire: Papyrus grecs d’époque byzantine (Cairo 1911, 1913). Jean was killed in the battle at Vauquois on the Lorraine during World War I, and his father Gaston completed the third volume of Dioscorian papyri in 1916. Other Dioscorian papyri, obtained by antiquities dealers through sales and clandestine excavations, were published in Florence, London, Paris, Strasbourg, Princeton, Ann Arbor, the Vatican, etc.

== Aphrodito ==
The village of Kom Ashkaw is in Middle Egypt, south of Cairo and north of Luxor. It was originally an Egyptian city, but after Alexander the Great conquered Egypt in 332 B.C., it was given the Greek name "Aphroditopolis" (“The City of Aphrodite”) and was made the capital city of its nome (an administrative district, like a US county). Before the 6th century, however, Aphroditopolis lost its status as a city, and the capital of the Aphroditopolite Nome was moved across the Nile River to Antaeopolis. The village of Aphrodito and the city of Antaeopolis were part of the larger administrative region of the Thebaid, which was under the jurisdiction of a doux, appointed by the Byzantine Emperor. The doux had his administrative center in Antinoopolis on the east bank of the Nile River.

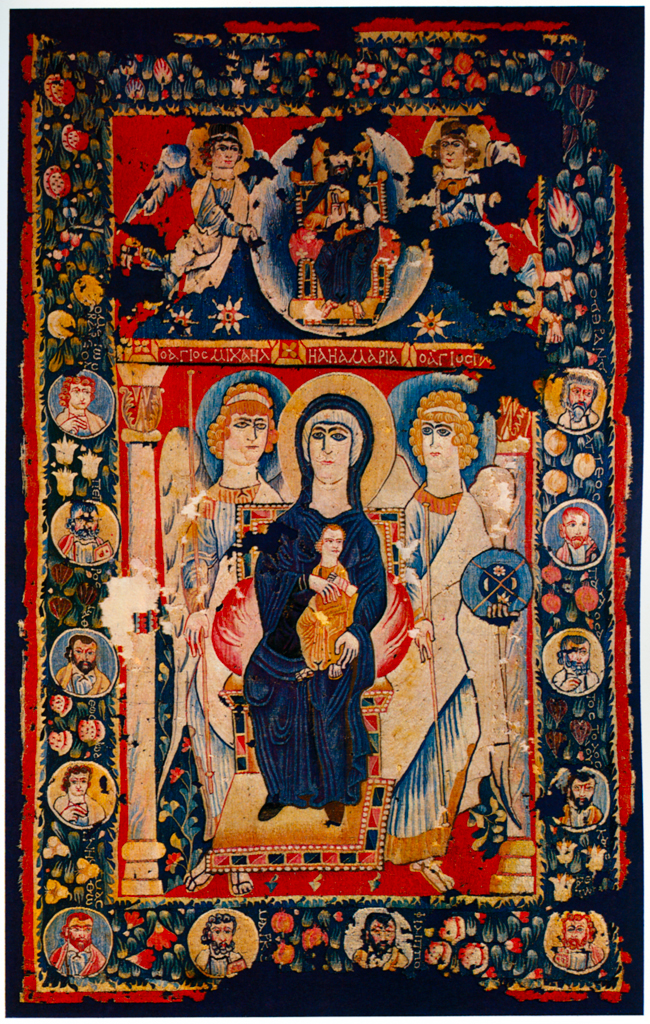
Theotokos. Coptic tapestry. Cleveland. 6th century representation of the Mother of God as a Byzantine Empress.

Aphrodito was situated in an environment that was highly poetic and religious. Nonnus, the most influential poet of the Early Byzantine Era (AD 300–700), had come from Panopolis, 42 km. southeast of Aphrodito. Other poets from the Thebaid had not only become celebrities—such as Musaeus Grammaticus, Colluthus, and Christodorus—but also were part of a poetic revolution of that time. These poets, though Egyptians, wrote their verses in the Greek dialect of Homer. Perhaps one of the reasons for this movement was to usurp the pagan vocabulary and style of the most honored ancient poet for Christian purposes. Dioscorus continued and developed this revolution by writing encomiastic poems (poems of praise) in an Homeric style. The community was also active religiously. According to the New Testament, Egypt was the first home of young Jesus and his family. And according to Patristic literature, Egypt was the birthplace of Christian monasticism. In Northern Egypt, the areas of Nitria, Kellia, and Wadi Natrun contained large monastic centers that attracted devout followers from both the Eastern and Western halves of the Byzantine Empire. In southern Egypt, one of the first Christian monasteries was established at Pbow, 127 km. southeast of Aphrodito. Less than 40 km. south of Aphrodito was the White Monastery, founded by the vigorous Coptic monk Shenoute. The father of Dioscorus himself, Apollos, established and later entered his own monastery. In fact, Aphrodito and its vicinity “boasted over thirty churches and nearly forty monasteries.”

== Biography ==
=== Early years ===
There is no surviving record for the early years of Dioscorus. His father Apollos was an entrepreneur and local official. The commonly accepted date for the birth of Dioscorus is around AD 520. Although there is no evidence, it is likely that Dioscorus went to school in Alexandria, where one of his teachers might have been the Neoplatonic philosopher John Philoponus. Although Alexandria was not the most prominent place for a legal education – that was the famed law school of Beirut – young men did travel there for rhetorical training preliminary to the study of law. These included the celebrated poet Agathias, a contemporary of Dioscorus, who at an early age published a successful collection of poems called the Cycle and later became the center of a circle of prominent poets in the Byzantine capital, Constantinople.

Back in Aphrodito, Dioscorus married, had children, and pursued a career similar to his father's: acquiring, leasing out, and managing property, and helping in the administration of the village. His first dated appearance in the papyrus is 543. Dioscorus had the assistant of the defensor civitatis of Antaeopolis examine the damage done by a shepherd and his flock to a field of crops, which was owned by the Monastery of Apa Sourous but managed by Dioscorus.

=== Constantinople ===
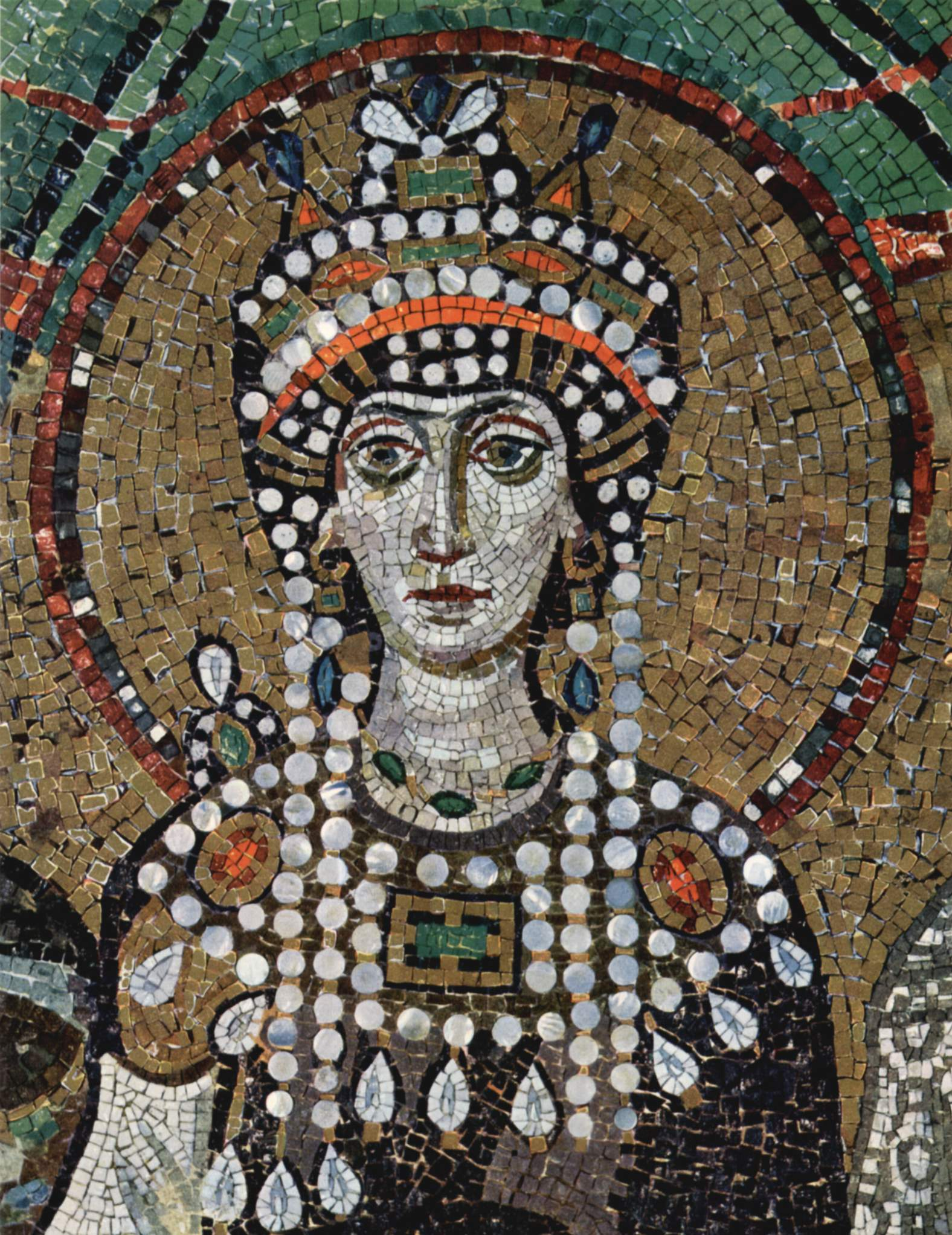
Empress Theodora. Mosaic. San Vitale, Ravenna. 6th century representation of the Empress Theodora.

Dioscorus also became engaged in legal work. In 546/7, after his father Apollos died, Dioscorus wrote a formal petition to Emperor Justinian and a formal explanation to Empress Theodora about tax conflicts affecting Aphrodito. The village was under the special patronage of the Empress, and had been granted the status of autopragia. This meant that the village could collect its own public taxes and deliver them directly to the imperial treasury. Aphrodito was not under the jurisdiction of the pagarch, stationed in Antaeopolis, who handled the public taxes for the rest of the nome. Dioscorus's petition and explanation to the imperial palace described the pagarch's violations of their special tax status, including theft of the collected tax money.

The communications to Constantinople seem to have had little effect, and in 551 (three years after the death of Theodora), Dioscorus travelled with a contingency of Aphroditans to Constantinople to present the problem to the Emperor directly. Dioscorus may have spent three years in the capital of the Byzantine Empire. In poetry, the city was very active. Not only was Agathias now writing there, but also Paul the Silentiary and Romanus the Melodist. In respect to the Aphroditans' tax problems, Dioscorus was able to obtain an imperial rescript, three copies of which have survived in his archive. The Emperor instructs the Duke of the Thebaid to investigate and, if justified, to stop the aggressions of the pagarch. There is no evidence of further tax violations by the pagarch until after the death of Justinian in 565.

=== Antinoopolis ===
In 565/6 Dioscorus left Aphrodito for Antinoopolis, the capital city of the Thebaid and the residence of the doux. He remained there for about seven years. His motivation for the move is nowhere made clear. But surmising from the surviving documents, one can conclude that he was attracted by the opportunity to advance his legal career in the proximity of the Duke and likewise was compelled by the increasing violence of the pagarch against Aphrodito and his own family. The legal documents from that period show that Dioscorus wrote the final will for the Surgeon General (Phoebammon), arbitrated in family property disputes, composed marriage and divorce contracts, and continued writing petitions about the offenses of the pagarch. One such petition, P.Cair.Masp. I 67002, describes how a group of Aphroditans on their way to the annual cattle market were ambushed. They were eventually put into a prison in Antaeopolis, under the control of the pagarch Menas, where they were tortured and robbed and their animals were seized. Menas and his men then attacked the village of Aphrodito itself: he blocked the irrigation, extorted money, burned down homes, and violated the nuns. All these crimes were committed in the name of collecting the public taxes, although Aphrodito had never failed a payment and Menas had no right to collect them. A formal explanation, P.Lond. V 1677, describes the attacks by Menas on Dioscorus himself and his family. He seized property owned by Dioscorus and transferred it to his assistants, leaving Dioscorus with only the tax liability. Menas proceeded to pillage the home of Dioscorus's brother-in-law and seized his land too, reducing him and his family to poverty. He then arrested Dioscorus's own son.

Before May 574, Dioscorus left Antinoopolis. The reason for his departure is not explained. It might have been related to domestic affairs, to his career, or to the changed situation in Constantinople. The violent crimes against Aphrodito and Dioscorus (described above) were committed under the reign of Justin II, who had launched a savage persecution of Christians that did not adhere to Chalcedonian dogmas, including Egyptian Copts. But Justin went completely insane and abdicated, and in 574, Tiberius and Empress Sophia, the wife of Justin, took over the management of the Byzantine Empire.

=== Return to Aphrodito ===
Back home in Aphrodito, it seems that Dioscorus withdrew from legal affairs and administrative responsibilities. Much of his poetry was composed during his stay in Antinoopolis or after he had returned to Aphrodito. His documents now focus on mundane, rural activities. His last dated document, a land lease written by his hand in an account book, is April 5, 585.

== Poetry ==
=== Publications ===
Dioscorus might have recited his poems and circulated them locally, but there is no evidence that they were ever published during his lifetime. Jean Maspero published the first collection of Dioscorian poems in 1911: “Un dernier poète grec d’Égypte: Dioscore, fils d’Apollôs.” This journal article included the texts of 13 poems, French translations, and an analysis of the style. Then between 1911 and 1916, Jean and Gaston Maspero republished the poems along with Dioscorian documents in three volumes of Papyrus grecs d'époque byzantine. These poems were all part of the papyrus collection owned by the Egyptian Museum in Cairo. In 1962, Ernst Heitsch published 29 Dioscorian poems that were among papyrus fragments held in a variety of museums and libraries. For over thirty-five years, this was the authoritative edition. The most comprehensive edition at the present time is by Jean-Luc Fournet, who in 1999 published 51 Dioscorian poems and fragments (including 2 that he considered of dubious authenticity). In addition to the texts and commentaries offered by Maspero, Heitsch, Fournet, and the initial editors of other poems, a comprehensive study of his poetry was published by Leslie MacCoull in 1988: Dioscorus of Aphrodito: His Work and His World (Berkeley). Clement Kuehn published a reinterpretation of his poetry in 1995: Channels of Imperishable Fire: The Beginnings of Christian Mystical Poetry and Dioscorus of Aphrodito (New York).

=== Interpretations ===
The reactions by modern readers to his poetry have varied widely. The papyrologists and historians that first examined them were not impressed. Influenced by their backgrounds in Classical poetry, they compared the Dioscorian verses primarily to Classical standards. The most frequent objection was that his verses were obscure: the editors thought that the lines did not make sense – or at least, were not saying what the editors expected them to say. A more positive assessment was offered by Leslie MacCoull, who insisted that a reader must take Dioscorus's Coptic background into consideration when reading the poetry. Many of the poems seemed to be praising unknown dignitaries – including an Emperor and several Dukes – and some papyrologists concluded that Dioscorus wrote the poems to get favors from government administrators (whom the papyrologists vaguely and inconsistently identified). Clement Kuehn, however, proposed that the poems be viewed not from a Classical, Hellenistic, or even a strictly Egyptian perspective, but through a lens of Byzantine culture and spirituality, in which Dioscorus and the Thebaid were so deeply immersed. Kuehn demonstrated that the poems fit neatly and masterfully into the allegorical style that was pervasive in the pictorial art and literature of the Early Byzantine Era. That is: Dioscorus, influenced by allegorical commentaries on the Homeric epics and Bible, and by the allegorical icons and church art of the 6th century, was praising Christ, Old Testament patriarchs, and the saints in heaven as if they were the Emperor, kings, and dignitaries in a Byzantine court.
