= Aphroditopolis =

Aphroditopolis or Aphrodites Polis (Ancient Greek: Ἀφροδίτης πόλις), meaning city of Aphrodite, is the Greek name of several places in ancient Egypt:

- Aphroditopolis in the Antaiopolite Nome, also called Aphrodito, ancient Per-Wadjet, now the village of Kom Ishqaw
- Aphroditopolis in the Aphroditopolite Nome, now the village of Atfih
- Aphroditopolis in the Faiyum Oasis, village attested between 3rd century BC and the 3rd century AD
- Aphroditopolis in the Pathyrite Nome, now the village of Gebelein

== See also ==
- Aphroditopolite Nome
