= Hemamieh =

Archaeological settlement

Coordinates: 26°55′N 31°29′E

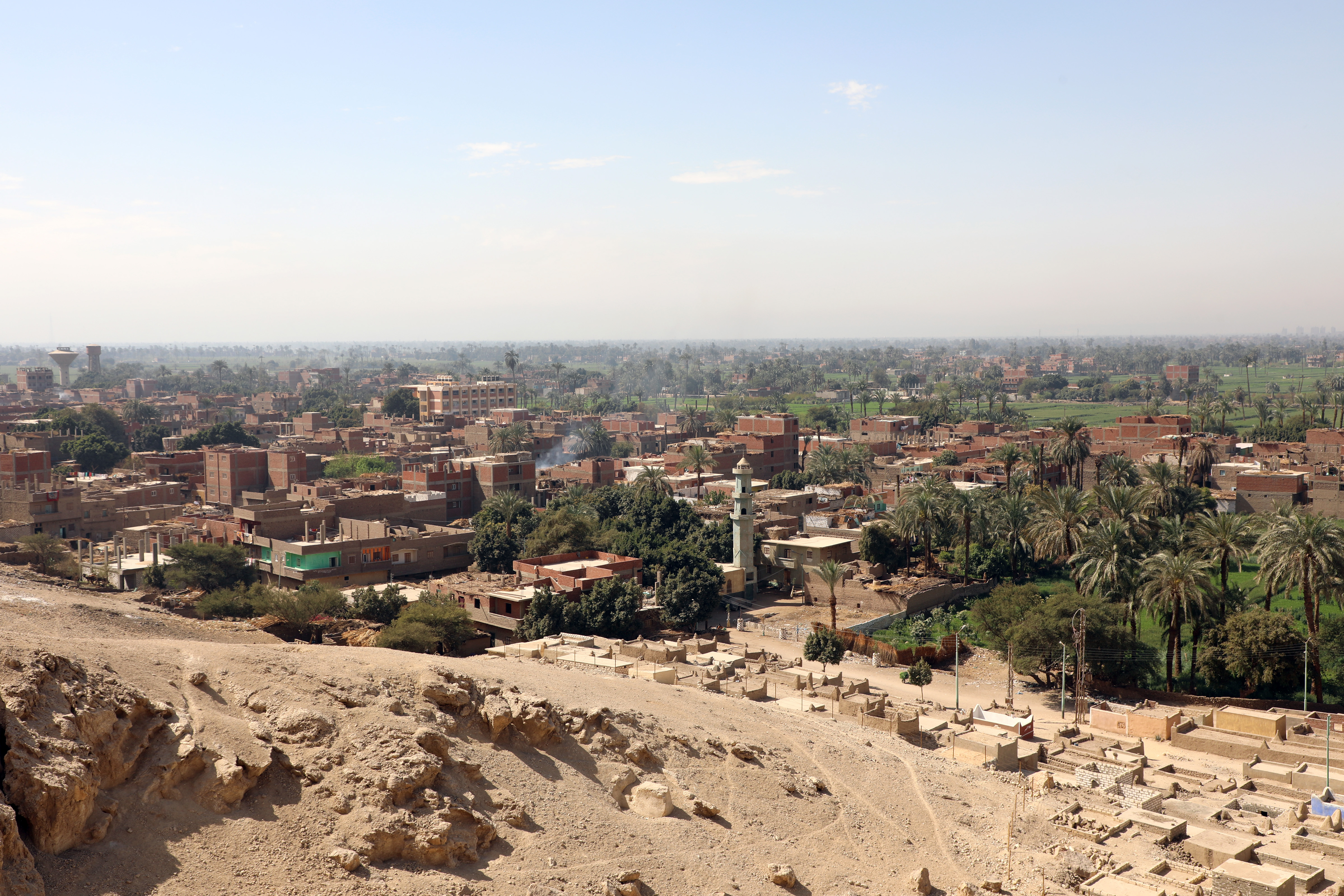
View of Hemamieh to the west in 2019

Hemamieh (El-Hammamiya) is a village located in the Sohag Governorate in Middle Egypt on the east bank of the Nile.

The site is significant in Egyptology because of its cemeteries from the Prehistoric and Pharaonic periods. From 1922 to 1931 the British archaeologists Gertrude Caton-Thompson and Guy Brunton excavated approximately 10,000 tombs from Qau el-Kebir in the south to Matmar in the north, across an area of about 36 km.

At Hemamieh there were some smaller cemeteries, including important burials of the Badari culture and rock tombs of the Old Kingdom period belonging to the nomarchs of the Wadjit-nome. The best preserved one belongs to Kaikhenet (II), who lived at the beginning of the Fifth Dynasty.
