= A-Group culture =

Ancient Nubian culture from the late 4th millennium BC

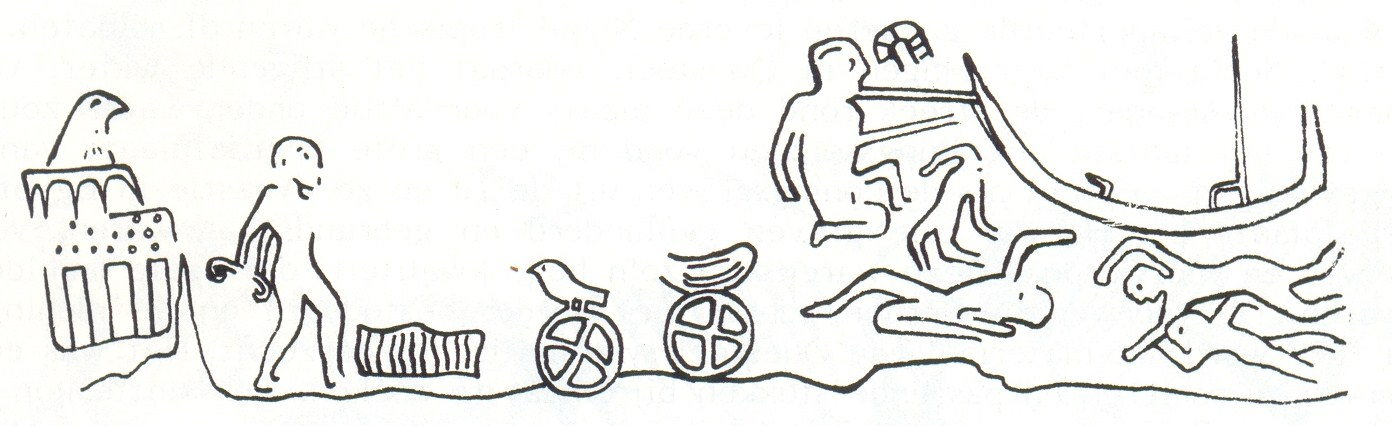
The Relief of Gebel Sheikh Suleiman likely shows the victory of an early Pharaoh, possibly Djer, over A-Group Nubians circa 3000 BC, nearly dating back to the First Dynasty. This rock carving represents an Egyptian campaign into Nubia and was found near the second cataract of the Nile River.

The A-Group was the first powerful society in Nubia, located in modern northern Sudan and southern Egypt and flourished between the First and Second Cataracts of the Nile in Lower Nubia. It lasted from the 4th millennium BC, reached its climax at c. 3100 BC, and fell 200 years later c. 2900 BC.

== Overview ==
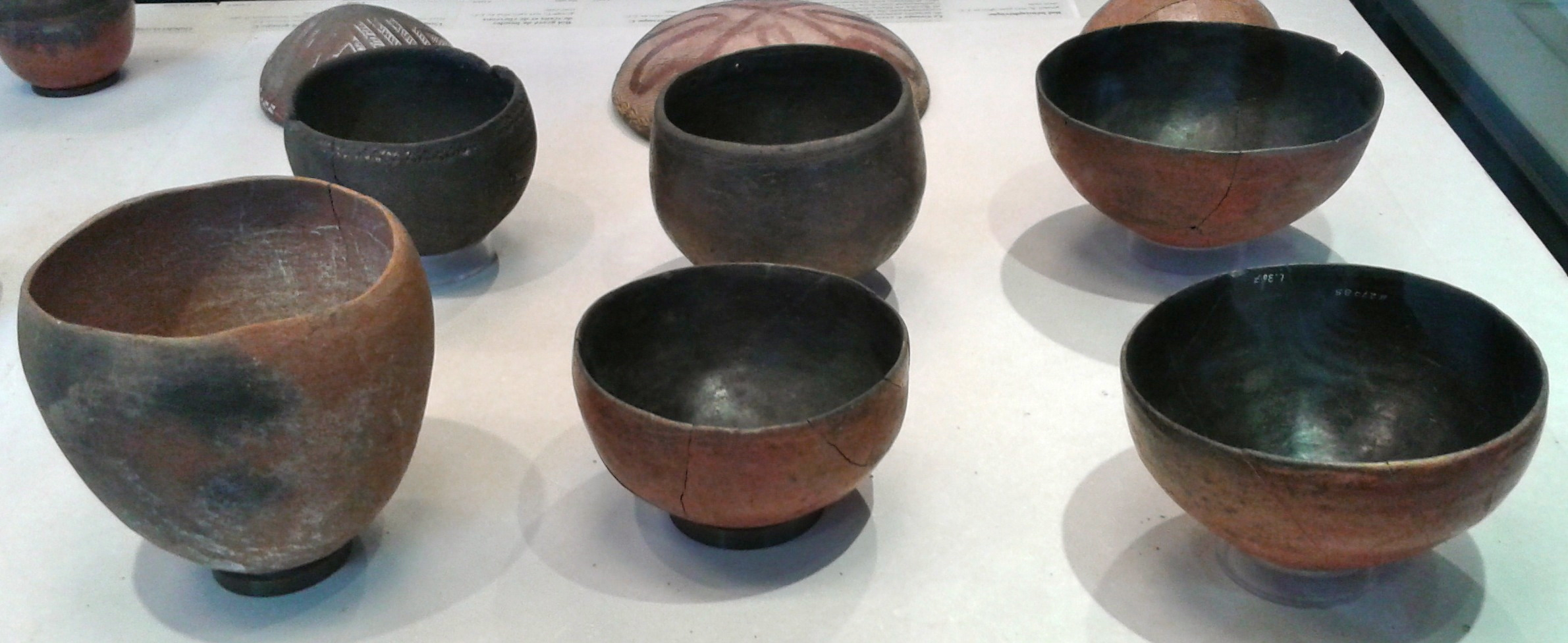
Black-topped red ware vessels of the A-Group, Musée du Louvre

In 1907, the Egyptologist George A. Reisner first discovered artifacts belonging to the A-Group culture. Reisner named this society the A-Group, which is now an outdated archaeological term, but remained in the literature. Early hubs of this civilization included Kubaniyya in the north and Buhen in the south, with Aswan, Sayala, Toshka and Qustul in between.

The A-Group population was once described as having been closely related to the pre-dynastic Egyptians as an ethnic group, although this view is considered largely outdated, with the A-Group now considered of having been related to both Sub-Saharan and North African populations. The A-Group maintained commercial ties with the Ancient Egyptians. They traded raw materials like incense, ebony and ivory, which were gathered from the southern riverine area. They also bartered carnelian from the Western Desert as well as gold mined from the Eastern Desert in exchange for Egyptian craft products, olive oil, and other items from the Mediterranean basin.

A-Group dwellings consisted mostly of reed huts and rock shelters, with most settlements taking the form of temporary settlements and pastoralist communities. A substantial A-Group settlement is at the site of Afyeh in Lower Nubia, where the remains of houses with stone foundation slabs have also been found. The location, architecture, and material culture of Afyeh, along with its uniqueness in Nubia, suggest that it may have been an Egyptian (Naqadian) outpost.

A-Group Nubians were semi-nomadic herders and rudimentary agriculturalists who also practised extensive fishing, hunting and gathering. Evidence of agriculture first appears in the Terminal A-Group period, c. 3200–3000 BC (contemporary with Naqada IIIB).

== Social organization ==
Ceramic decorative motifs conserved among the A-Group and the settlement at Kadero, located northeast of Khartoum, suggests that the two groups were influenced by one another, whether directly or indirectly through trade with Egypt. Additionally, the existence of an elite group in Kadero parallels the evidence of an elite group within the A-Group.

Cemetery L at Qustul provides evidence of an elite burial, containing nearly 200 pottery vessels, some containing expensive imports from Egypt and Palestine.

There is little evidence outside of Cemetery L to suggest social stratification of the A-Group. However, there is evidence that the A-Group moved from a pastoralist society to a more sedentary society by the end of the 4th millennium BC, which could suggest that the conditions were right to develop more complex social organization.

== Pottery ==
The two main types of pottery created during the A-Group period were eggshell ceramics and black-topped red ware. Eggshell ceramics are characterized by their eggshell-thin walls. Black-topped red ware pottery was created by oxidizing the clay, rich in iron, creating the distinctive red color. Subsequently, the rim was dipped in sawdust to cut off oxygen supply, creating the "black-topped" rim.

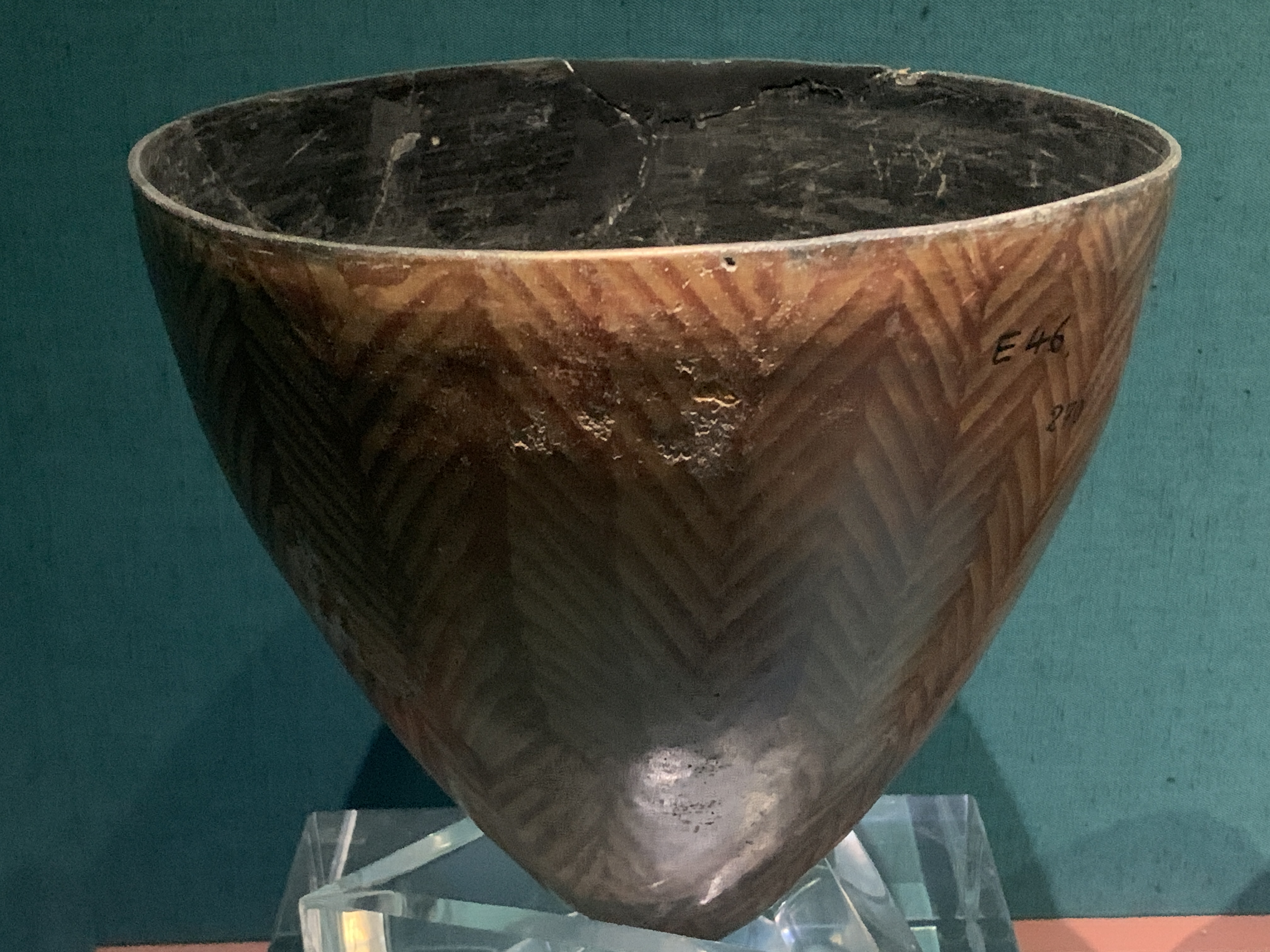
A-Group eggshell ceramic vase.

== Cemeteries L, V, and W of Qustul and debate about the origins of dynastic Egypt ==
Almost all knowledge about the A-Group comes from cemeteries, as few settlements have been excavated. Cemetery L is a royal cemetery dating back to the A-Group, and excavated by archaeologist Bruce Williams. Cemetery L contains tombs of rulers and high officials, Cemetery V contains tombs of other officials, and Cemetery W exclusively contains burials of people with lesser status. Excavations at Cemetery L yielded an incense burner, which was adorned with ancient Egyptian royal iconography. Williams asserted that the royal monarchy of Egypt originated in Qustul. He based his reasoning on Cemetery L from three archaeological finds: the size of the tombs, their expensive contents, and royal iconography (such as pottery vessels and stone censers).

The earliest known examples of Egyptian royal iconography, such as, e.g., the representation of the Red Crown on a late Naqada I (c. 3500 BC) pottery vessel from Abydos or the triumphal scenes in the painting from Hierakonpolis Tomb 100 (c. 3400-3300 BC) are much older than the Qustul censer. It seems thus that it was the Qustul rulers who adopted symbols of royal authority developed in Egypt and not vice versa.

Furthermore, Williams received backlash from William Y. Adams and Maria Carmela Gatto. Gatto argued that Bruce Williams explicitly denied making such a sweeping claim, saying that he was only trying to raise the possibility that dynastic Egypt originated near Qustul, and Nubia facilitated that process. Gatto additionally referenced the Red Crown from the late Naqada I vessel, referenced above, claiming that Nubia almost certainly did not play a pivotal role in the rise of the Egyptian monarchy. While she also mentions that the tombs found in Qustul were comparable to that of Egyptian ruler's tombs, William Y. Adams suggests that the large size and contents of their grave support a different story than the one Williams paints, relating back to social stratification. He states that the large tombs and their contents provide evidence for a stratified society, one that archaeologists previously had not envisioned in the A-group period. He claims that this evidence cannot be extended and correlated to the Egyptian monarchy. Adams also argues that the Qustul incense burner found in the cemetery may be better suited to prove that the monarchy was situated somewhere near the Nile Valley instead of the monarchy being initially situated in Nubia.

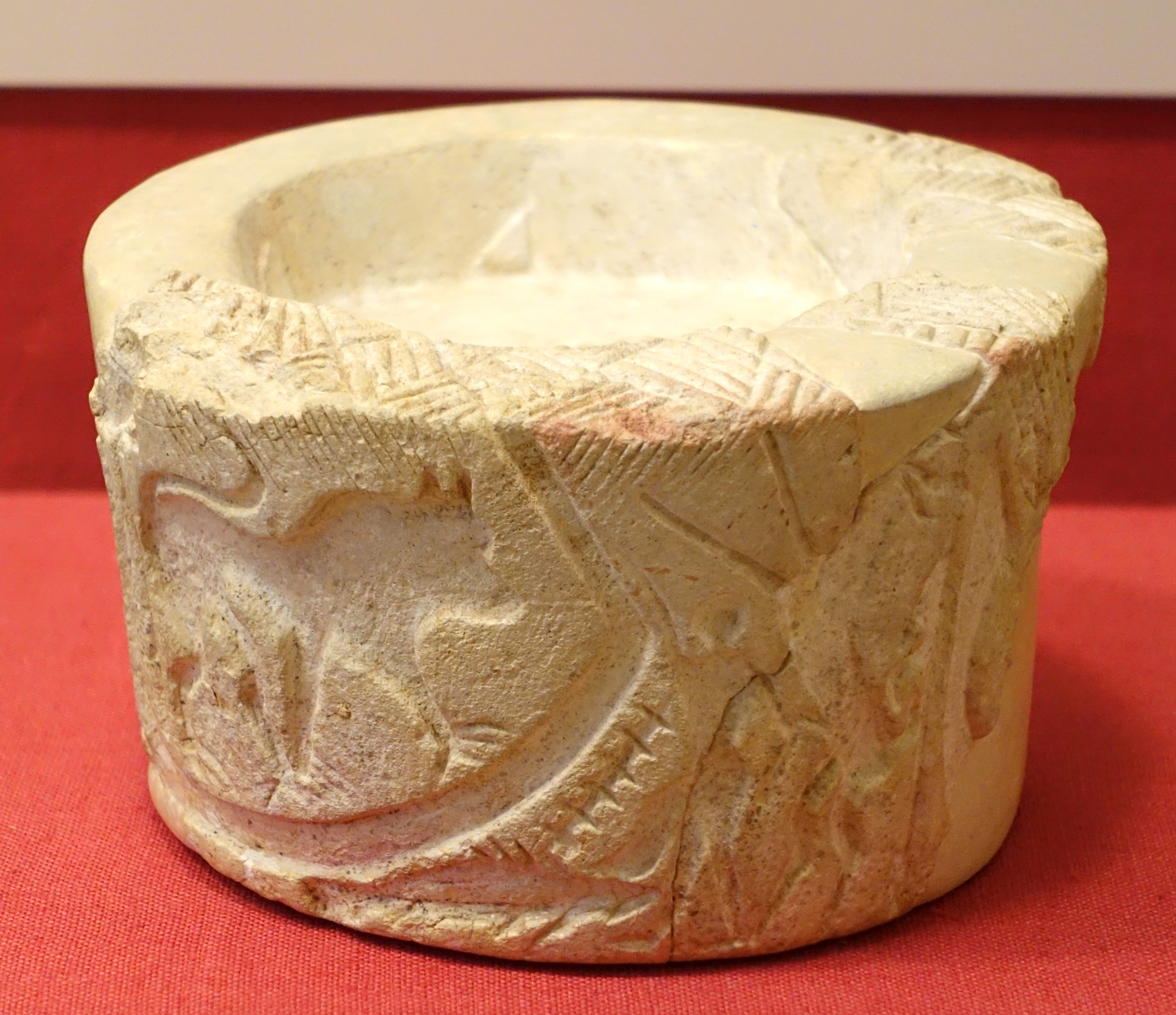
A-Group incense burner found at Qustul

== Genetic lineage tracing ==
From excavations at A-Group cemeteries, archaeologists have been tracing the genetic and ancestral lineage between A-Group Nubians and other societies. The specimens found in A-Group cemeteries typically had hair of a black or dark brown hue. On average, the men were 169.9 cm in height and the women stood around 155.5 cm. Some individuals were wrapped in leather and positioned on reed mats. All of the tombs contained various burial items, including personal ornaments, utensils and ceramics.

According to a study of Nubian dental affinities by Joel Irish in 2005, traits characterizing Late Paleolithic as well as early and middle Neolithic samples from Nubia are common in recent populations south of the Sahara, whereas traits shared by Final Neolithic Nubians bear some similarities to those found among groups originating to the north, i.e. in Egypt and, to a diminishing degree, greater North Africa, West Asia, and Europe, suggesting close contacts in this period with Egypt.

Dental trait analysis of A-Group fossils found affinities with populations inhabiting Northeast Africa, the Nile valley, and East Africa. Among the sampled populations, the A-Group people were nearest to the Kerma culture bearers, Kush populations in Upper Nubia, and to Ethiopians. This is followed by the Meroitic, X-Group and Christian period inhabitants of Lower Nubia and the Kellis population in the Dakhla Oasis, as well as C-Group and Pharaonic era skeletons excavated in Lower Nubia and ancient Egyptians (Naqada, Badari, Hierakonpolis, Abydos and Kharga in Upper Egypt; Hawara in Lower Egypt).

In 2020, Kanya Godde analysed a series of crania which included two Egyptian (predynastic Badarian and Naqada series), a series of A-Group Nubians, and a Bronze Age series from Lachish, Palestine. The two pre-dynastic series had strongest affinities, followed by closeness between the Naqada and the Nubian series. Further, the Nubian A-Group plotted nearer to the Egyptians, and the Lachish sample placed more closely to Naqada than Badari. According to Godde, the spatial-temporal model applied to the pattern of biological distances explains the more distant relationship of Badari to Lachish than Naqada to Lachish, as gene flow will cause populations to become more similar over time. Overall, both Egyptian samples included were more similar to the Nubian series than to the Lachish series.

== Culture ==
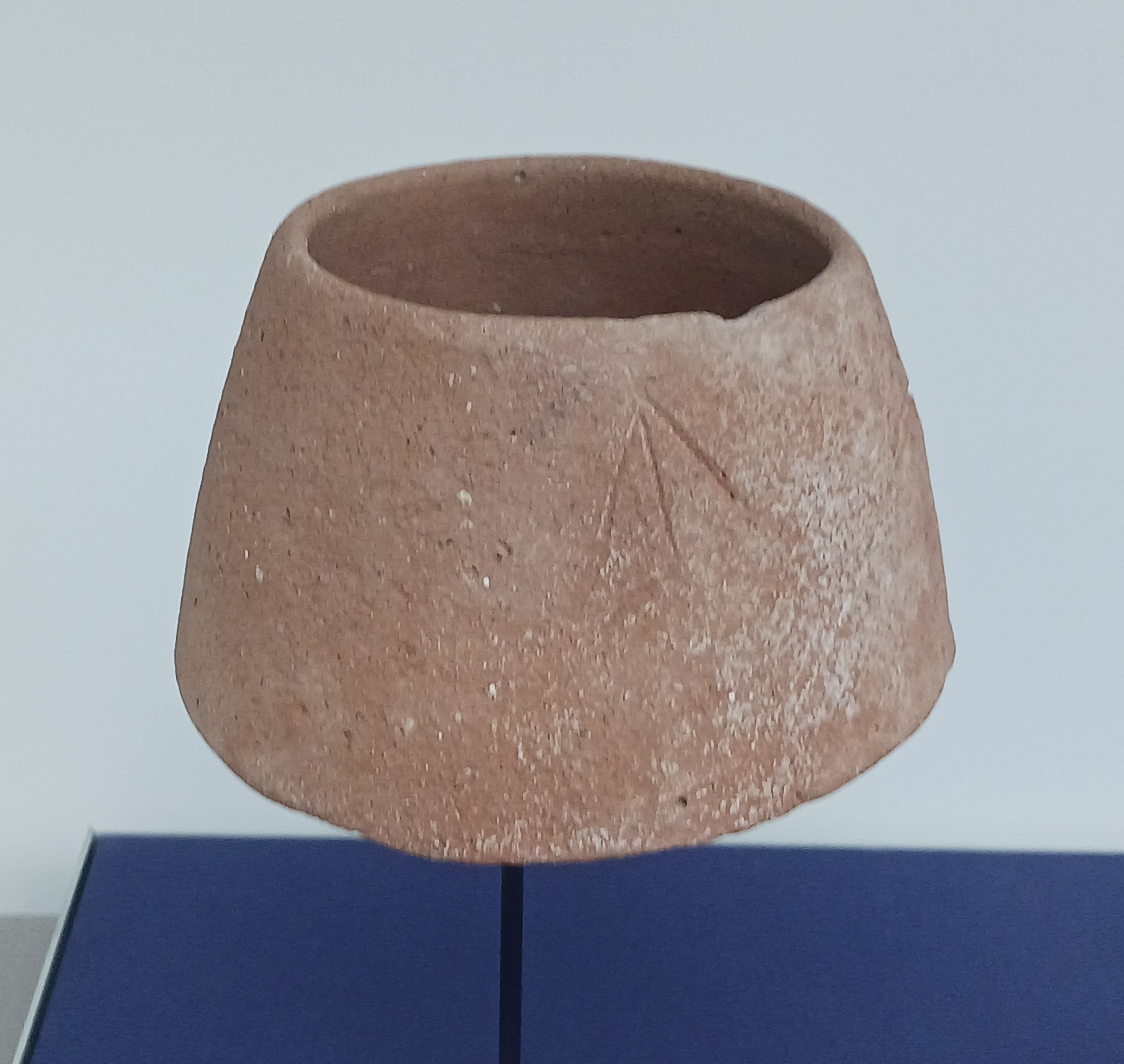
"Clayton ring". Bir Sahara BS-21, Early Dynastic period, A-Group culture, circa 2900 BCE. British Museum EA 76814.

More recent and broader studies have determined that the distinct pottery styles, differing burial practices, different grave goods and the distribution of sites all indicate that the Naqada people and the Nubian A-Group people were from different cultures. Kathryn Bard further states that "Naqada cultural burials contain very few Nubian craft goods, which suggests that while Egyptian goods were exported to Nubia and were buried in A-Group graves, A-Group goods were of little interest further north."

Nubian excavations in Serra East found that the bodies buried in the A-Group cemeteries would lay on either side with their head facing south or east. Similar to that of a curled-up position, their hands could be found near the face and their legs folded-in upwards. Leather wrappings were also found in the burials as a means of clothing and bags. However, this leather wrapping was not typically found in more lavish cemeteries, such as Cemetery L at Qustul. As for distinct pottery styles, decorative vessels were more likely to be found in larger tombs at Qustul, whereas simpler burial arrangements contained ripple-burnished or simple vessels. However, the archaeological cemeteries at Qustul are no longer available for excavations since the flooding of Lake Nasser.

According to David Wengrow, the A-Group polity of the late 4th millenninum BC is poorly understood since most of the archaeological remains are submerged underneath Lake Nasser.

Frank Yurco stated that depictions of pharonic iconography such as the royal crowns, Horus falcons and victory scenes were concentrated in the Upper Egyptian Naqada culture and A-Group Nubia. He further elaborated that:

"Egyptian writing arose in Naqadan Upper Egypt and A-Group Nubia, and not in the Delta cultures, where the direct Western Asian contact was made, further vititates the Mesopotamian-influence argument".

Oshiro Michinori argued, in reference to the A-Group culture, that the external influence from Nubia on the formation of Ancient Egypt in the pre-dynastic period to the dynasty period predates influence from eastern Mesopotamia. He notes an increase in the appreciation of the contribution of Nubia in the south to Ancient Egyptian culture at the time of his writing. According to him, chiefs of the same cultural level as Upper Egyptian powers existed in Lower Nubia and exhibited pharaonic iconography before the unification of Egypt.

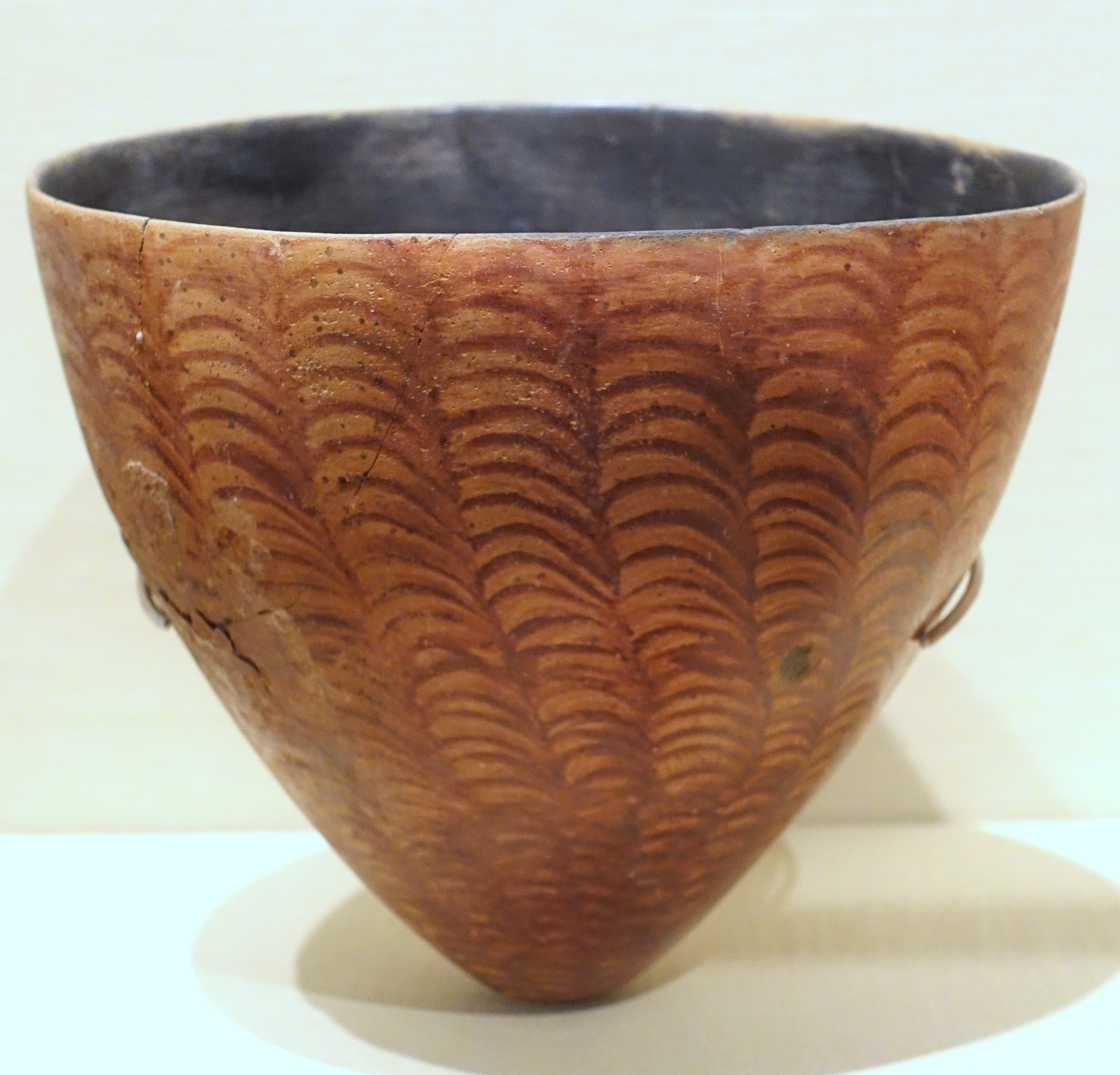
Bowl with exterior painted scallop decoration, Qustul, Cemetery V, tomb 67, A-Group, 3800–3000 BC, ceramic - Oriental Institute Museum, University of Chicago

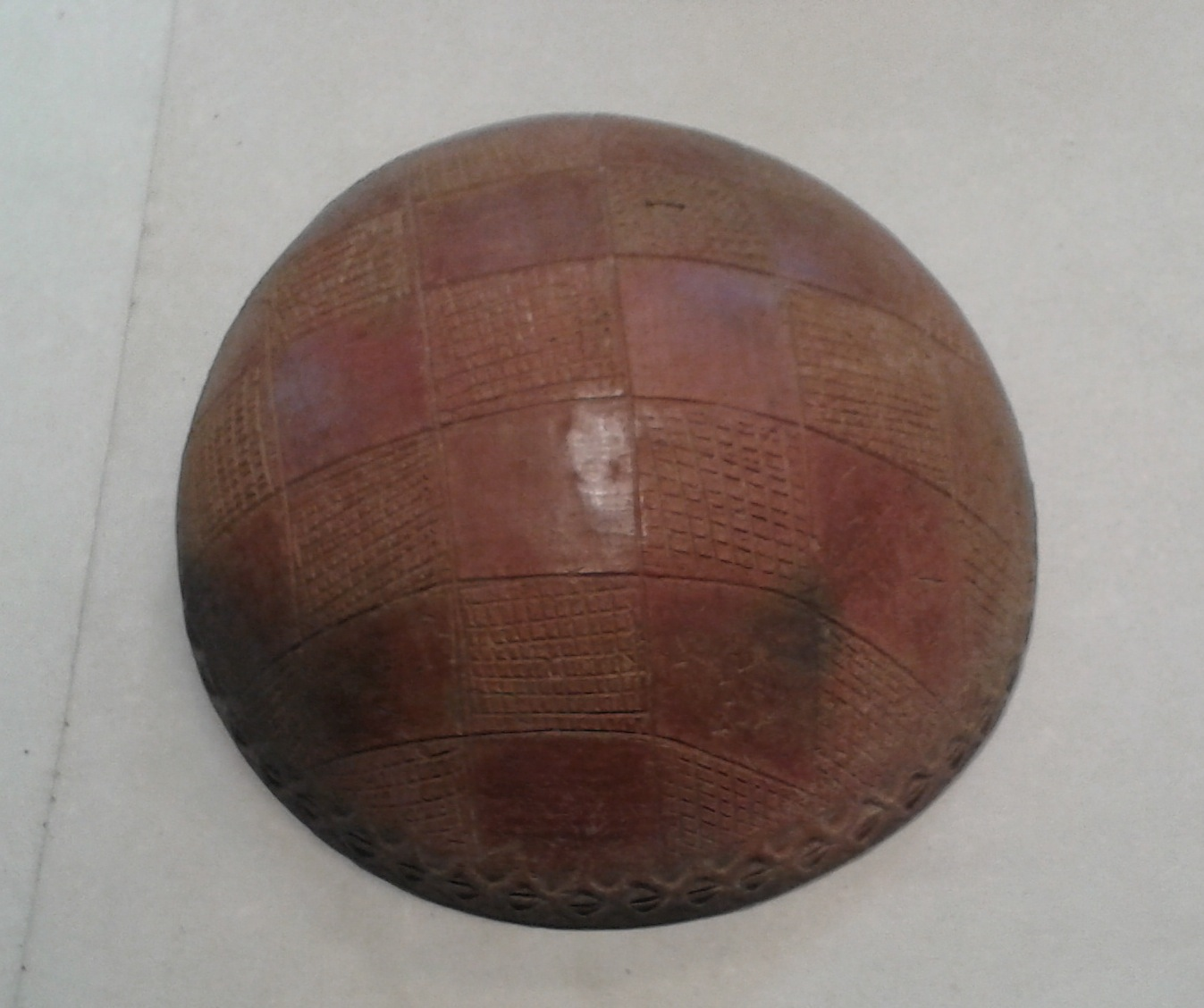
Decorated bowl of the A-Group, Musée du Louvre

== B-Group ==
It was originally determined by Reisner that the A-Group culture came to an end around 3100 BC, when it was destroyed by the First Dynasty rulers of Egypt. Reisner originally identified a B-Group and C-Group culture that existed within Nubia following the fall of the A-Group. However, the B-group theory became obsolete when Henry S. Smith demonstrated from funerary evidence that it was an impoverished manifestation of the A-Group culture while the culture was starting to disintegrate. With the existential crisis of the B-Group, it is suggested that these burials were simply poorer versions of A-group burials and that the span of the A-group culture lasted beyond 3100 BC.
