= Kaikhenet II =

Egyptian Nomarch

Kaikhenet
- Nomarch of the 10th nome of Upper Egypt
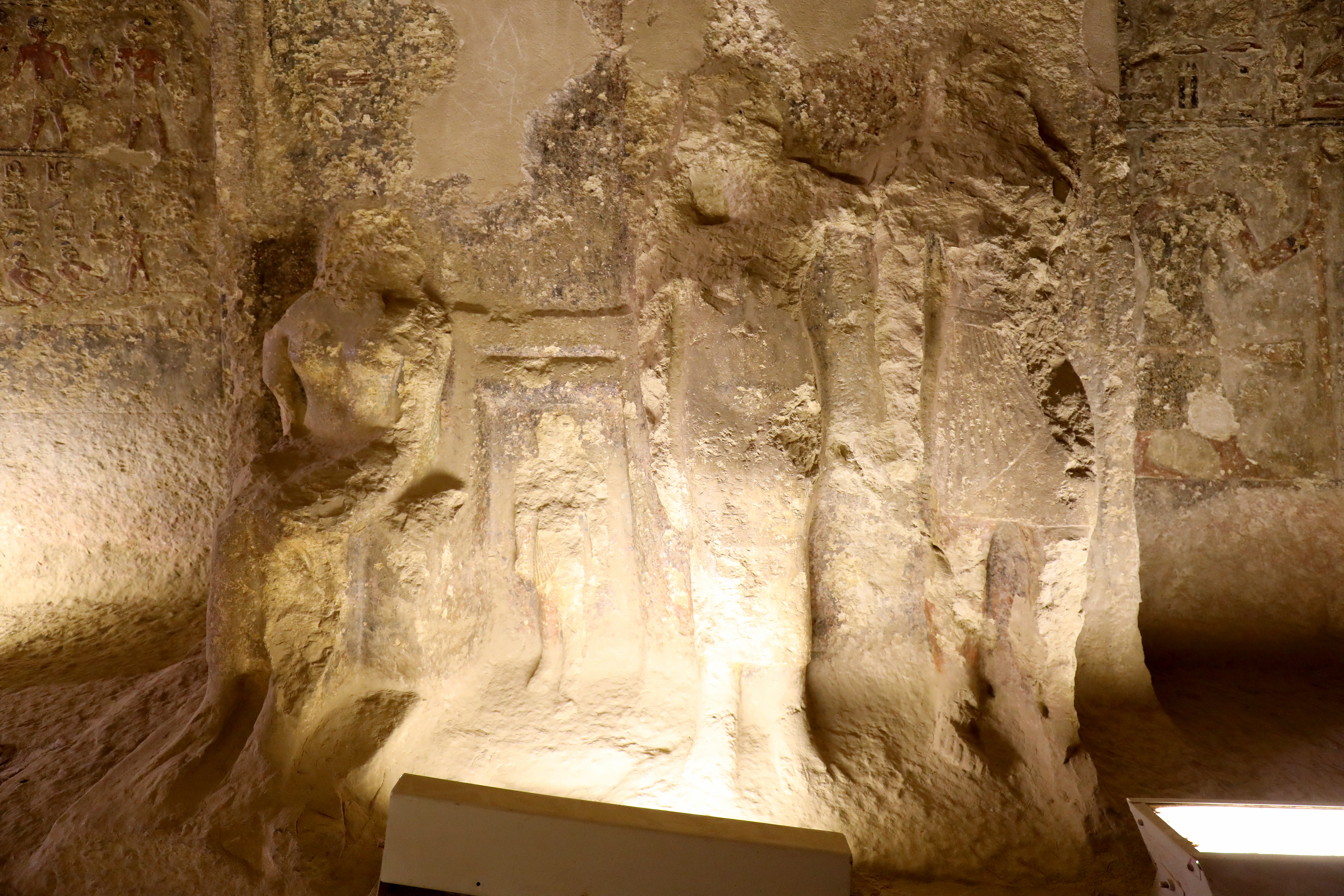
- Remains of statues in tomb of Kaikhenet II
- Dynasty: 5th Dynasty
- Burial: Hemamieh

Kaikhenet was an ancient Egyptian local Nomarch in the 10th Upper Egyptian nome; the latter called Wadjet in the Egyptian language. Kaikhenet lived at the beginning of the Fifth Dynasty and is known from his decorated rock cut tomb at Hemamieh. Decorated rock cut tombs are very rare in the Egyptian provinces before the end of the Fifth Dynasty. The tombs at Hemamieh are an exception. They belong to the earliest ones in the provinces. Kaikhenet II was most likely the son of another Nomarch also called Kaikhenet I. The father-son relation of both Nomarchs is not fully certain but in the tomb of Kaikhenet I is depicted a son called Kaikhenet, that might be Kaikhenet II. If this identification is correct, his mother was most likely Khentkaus, the wife of Kaikhenet I. Kaikhenet's II wife was a woman called Iufi. She bore several titles, including acquaintance of the king, priestess of Neith, north of the wall, priestess of Hathor, lady of Denderah, and king's daughter (of his body). Two sons are known. Rahotep became perhaps the successor of Kaikhenet as Nomarch. The other son was called Kaires and bore the simple title scribe. His daughters are called Nefertkau and Djefa.

Kaikhenet II bears in his tomb a high number of titles. He was overseer of commissions that was the main title for a Nomarch in the Fifth Dynasty. He was overseer of the king's people, overseer of the phyles of Upper Egypt and overseer of all work in the middle provinces of Upper Egypt. The latter three titles indicate that he was heavily involved in labour organisation in his province but also in the neighbouring provinces. Kaikhenet II was also king's son (of his body). The title king's son and king's daughter for his wife were at one point chiseled out. The reason for that is unknown.

The tomb of Kaikhenet is cut into the rock. It is formed of a corridor in the shape of an U, leaving a rectangular block of rock between the U-shaped gangway. This rock cut block formed some kind of mastaba. The mastaba is about 10 meters long and about 4 meters wide. The gangway is mainly decorated on both sides of the long gallery that is formed at the backside of the mastaba. The false doors are cut into the mastaba on its east side. The decoration of Kaikhenet's tomb is carved as relief into the rockcut gangway. The depictions show Kaikhenet and his family and servant. There are offering bearers and depictions of ships.
