= Per-Wadjet (Upper Egypt) =

Aphrodito ϫⲕⲱⲟⲩ ⲧϣⲕⲟⲟⲩ ⲧⲕⲟⲟⲩ كوم اشقاو
- Ancient Egyptian town
- Location within Egypt
- Coordinates: 26.8443°N 31.4235°E
- Country: Egypt
- Governorate: Sohag
- Time zone: UTC+2 (EET)
  - Summer (DST): UTC+3 (EEST)

Per-Wadjet (Ancient Greek: Ἀφροδίτης πόλις or Ἀφροδιτώ; Coptic: ϫⲕⲱⲟⲩ or ⲧϣⲕⲟⲟⲩ or ⲧⲕⲟⲟⲩ) was an Ancient Egyptian town in the 10th Upper Egyptian nome. The ancient town is identical with the modern village Kom Ishqau. Per-Wadjet is known from Egyptian sources since the New Kingdom. It was a cult place for Hathor, who was here identified with Wadjet. The Greeks identified Hathor with Aphrodite and called the town Aphroditopolis or Aphrodito. In Greek and Roman times the town was sometimes the nome capital. In Kom Ishqau were found the papyri of Dioscorus of Aphrodito, who lived there in the 6th century A.D. These papyri are an important source for life in Byzantine Egypt. A long-lost 2.200 year-old temple with words linked to Ptolemy IV Philopator was accidentally found during drilling work on a sewage project by the Egyptian archaeological mission in the village in early September 2019. Temple stones for installing the sewage pumps, limestone wall remnants and ground floor were also revealed during the excavation. Inscriptions described Hapi, the God of the Nile, presenting offerings of varied animal and birds in the walls of the temple.

== Hieroglyphs ==
O1 Z1 M13 I10 X1 O49
pr wꜣḏ(t)
in hieroglyphs
Era: New Kingdom
(1550–1069 BC)

M13 I10 O49 or V4 I10 O49
wꜣḏ
in hieroglyphs
