= Jean-Luc Fournet =

French papyrologist

Jean-Luc Fournet (25 February 1965, Bordeaux) is a French papyrologist.

== Biography ==
A former scientific member of the Institut Français d'Archéologie Orientale in Cairo (1992–1996), he was appointed chargé de recherche at the CNRS (1996–2004). He was elected directeur d'études at the École pratique des hautes études (IV^{e} section, historical and philological sciences) in Greek papyrology in 2004 and professor at the Collège de France as the chair of "Culture écrite de l'Antiquité tardive et papyrologie byzantine" in 2015. He is, among others, co-editor of the review Archiv für Papyrusforschung and vice-president of the Association francophone de coptologie.

== Distinctions ==
- 1999 : Bronze medal of the French National Centre for Scientific Research
- 1999 : Prize of the French Association of Greek Studies
- 2000 : Ambatielos Prize of the Académie des Inscriptions et Belles-Lettres
- 2009 : Lantier Prize of the Académie des Inscriptions et Belles-Lettres
- 2011 : Knight of the Ordre des Palmes académiques

== Publications ==
=== Books ===
- Hellénisme dans l'Égypte du VI^{e} siècle. La bibliothèque et l'œuvre de Dioscore d'Aphrodité (Cairo: IFAO, 1999) (ISBN 2-7247-0237-9).
- Alexandrie: une communauté linguistique? ou la question du grec alexandrin (Cairo: IFAO, 2009) (ISBN 978-2-7247-0497-6).
- These Shreds, Guardians of Human Memory: Papyrus and Culture in Late Antiquity (Paris: Collège de France, 2016)
- The Rise of Coptic: Egyptian Versus Greek in Late Antiquity (Princeton: Princeton University Press, 2020)

=== Collective works ===
- Les archives de Dioscore d'Aphrodité cent ans après leur découverte: Histoire et culture dans l'Égypte byzantine (Paris: De Boccard, 2009) (ISBN 978-2-7018-0250-3)
- Mélanges Jean Gascou. Textes et études papyrologiques (Paris: Association des amis du Centre d'histoire et civilisation de Byzance, 2016)
- Les Hieroglyphica d'Horapollon de l'Égypte antique à l'Europe moderne: histoire, fiction et réappropriation (Paris: Association des amis du Centre d'histoire et civilisation de Byzance, 2021)
- Le papyrus dans tous ses états: de Cléopâtre à Clovis (Paris: Collège de France, 2021)
- Champollion 1822 : et l'Égypte ancienne retrouva la parole (Paris: Collège de France, 2022)
