= Bir Sahara =

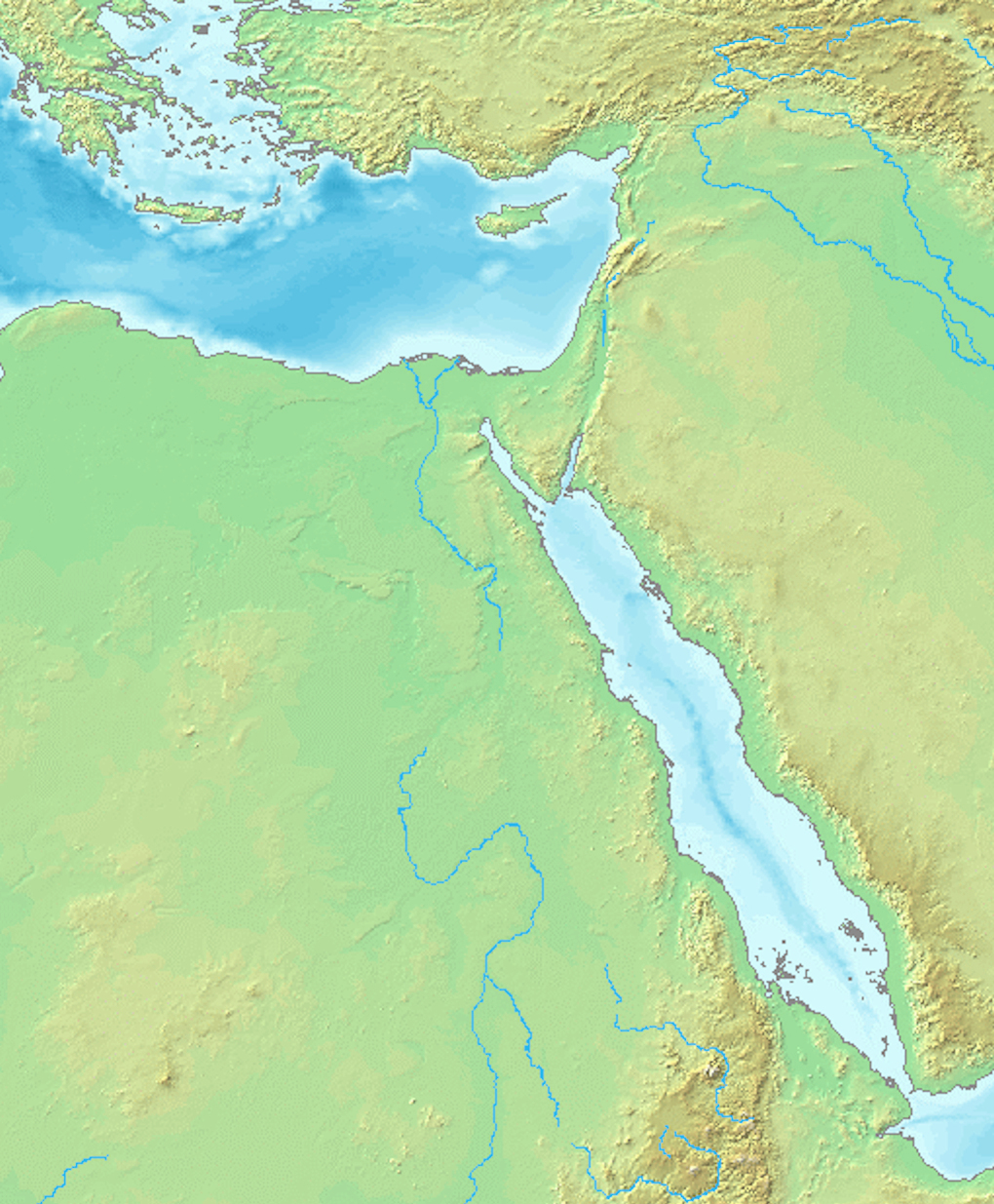
- Location within Egypt Location within Northeast Africa
- 22.9247°N 28.75975°E
- Location: Egypt
- Region: New Valley Governorate

Bir Sahara s an oasis and an archaeological site in southwestern Egypt. It has been identified as a site of the A-Group culture, traditional ascribed to the upper Nile valley. Various artifacts have been found, such as "Clayton rings", "Clayton disks" and pottery import of Predynastic or Early Dynastic Egyptian manufacture.

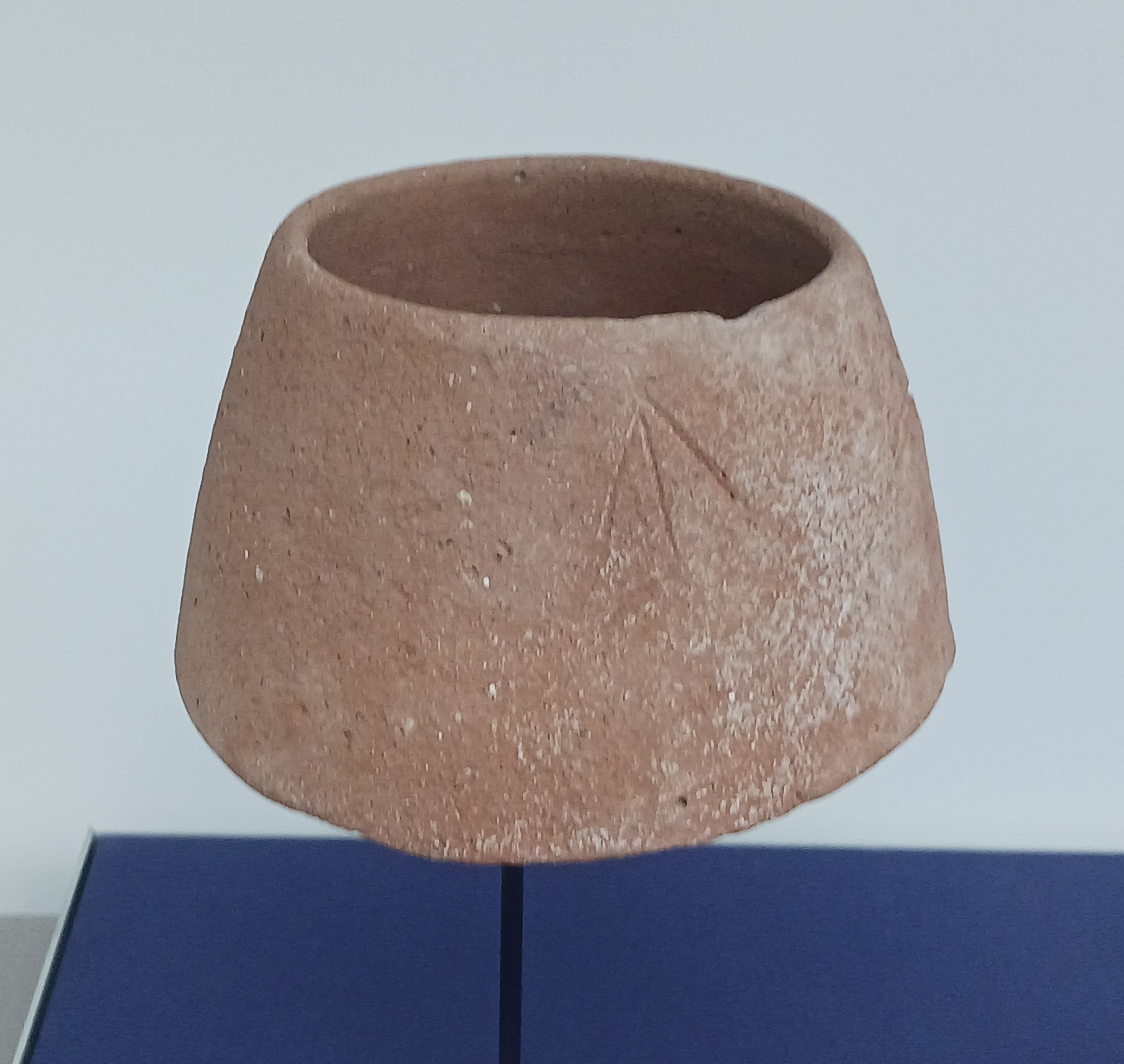
"Clayton ring". Bir Sahara BS-21, Early Dynastic period, A-Group culture, circa 2900 BCE. British Museum EA 76814.

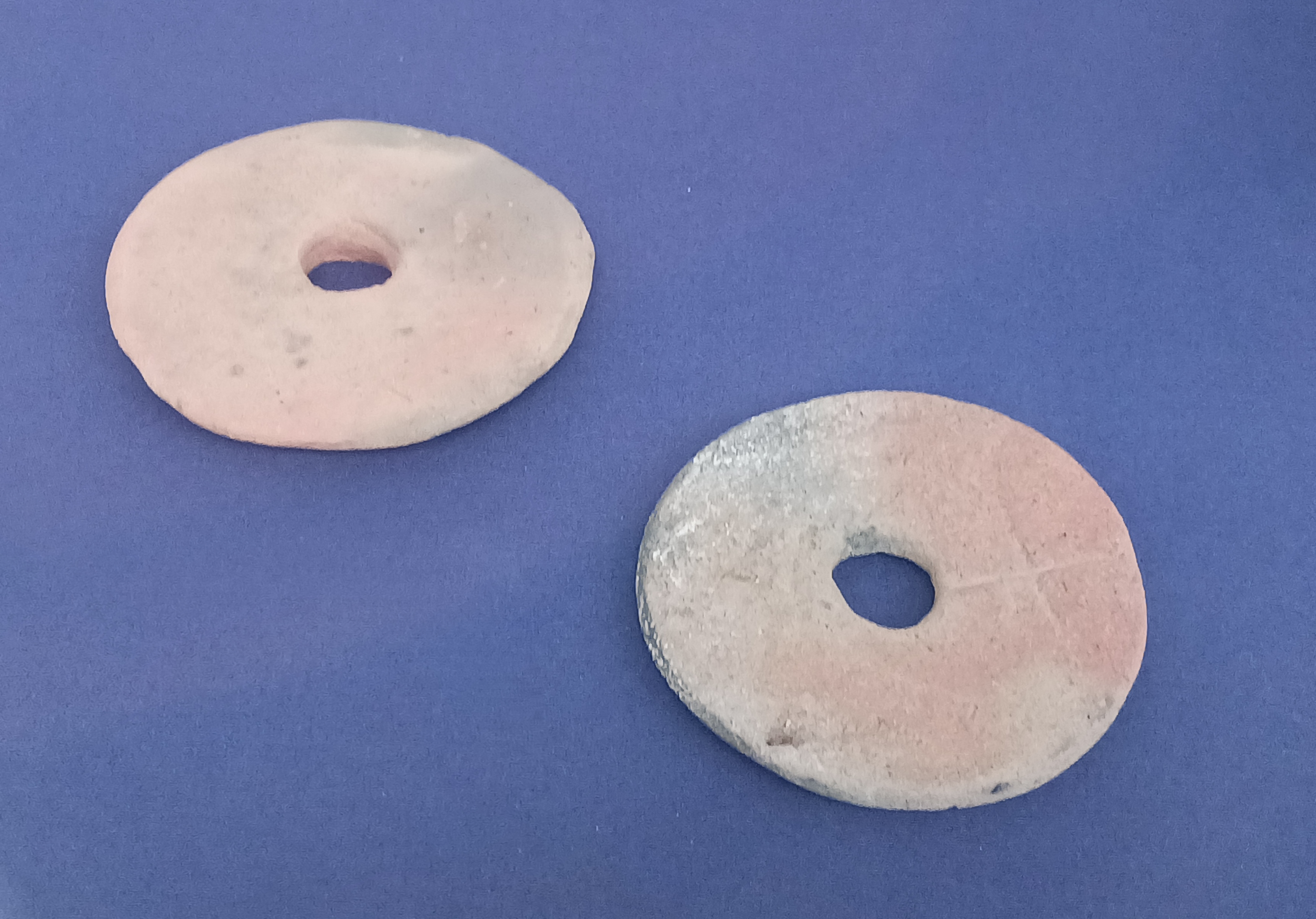
Clayton disks. Bir Sahara BS-21, Early Dynastic period, circa 2900 BCE. British Museum.

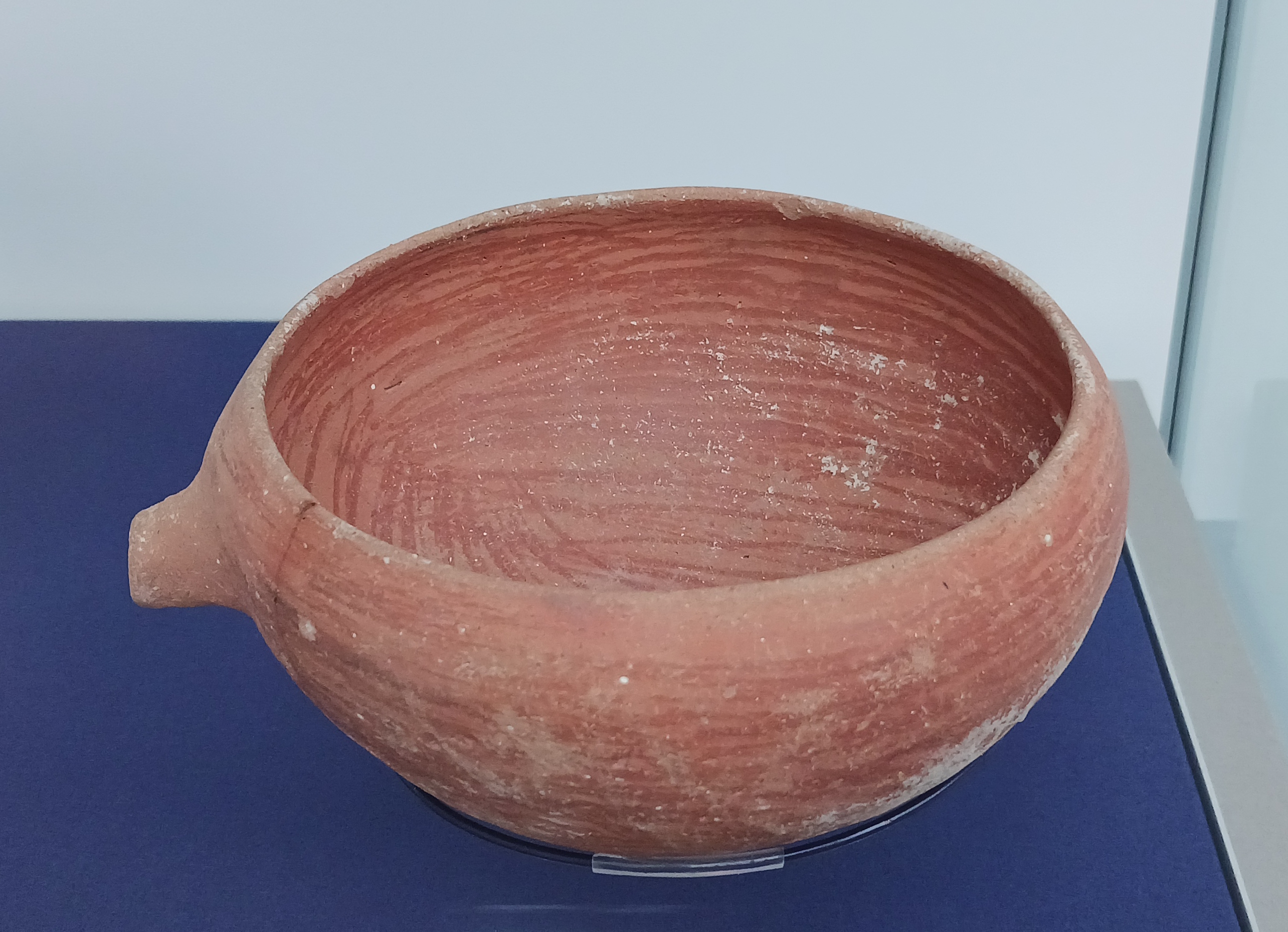
Naqada culture spouted bowl, made in Egypt for desert nomads. Bir Sahara BS-21, Early Dynastic period, circa 2900 BCE. British Museum.
