= Frank J. Yurco =

Frank J. Yurco (July 31, 1944 − February 6, 2004) was an American Egyptologist.

== Life ==
Yurco was born to Czechoslovak immigrants in New York City. He graduated from New York University and earned masters in Chicago. He came to the United States in 1967, and served in the U.S Army during the Vietnam War in 1968. Yurco held a position at the University of Chicago's Regenstein Library until 2002, when he was diagnosed with ALS, from which he died.

== Ancient Egyptian race controversy debate ==
He was part of a debate regarding the race issue of the Ancient Egyptians, in particular with Queen Nefertiti in the 1990s, which arose from American Afrocentrists claiming that "Queen Nefertiti was a beautiful black Egyptian queen,". Frank Yurco defended his view that ancient Egyptians, like modern Egyptians, were diverse, and neither "black" nor "white" as races are commonly understood. He continued that the mummified remains, anthropological records and other tests indicate that Egyptians varied greatly in complexion from a light Mediterranean, to a darker brown in upper Egypt, and even to the Nubians. He also further added that many darker-coloured Egyptians would be described as Black in modern terminology, Nubians among the foreign dynasties were ethnically closest to the ancient Egyptians.

Frank J. Yurco specifically outlined in a 1989 article that: "The ancient Egyptians, like their modern descendants, were of varying complexions of color, from the light Mediterranean type (like Nefertiti), to the light brown of Middle Egypt, to the darker brown of Upper Egypt, to the darkest shade around Aswan and the First Cataract region, where even today, the population shifts to Nubian." [...] "Ancient and modern Egyptian hair ranges from straight to wavy to woolly; in color, it varies from reddish brown to dark brown to black. Lips range from thin to full. Many Egyptians possess a protrusive jaw. Noses vary from high-bridged-straight to arched or even hooked-to flat-bridged, with bulbous to broad nostrils. In short, ancient Egypt, like modern Egypt, consisted of a very heterogeneous population." He further suggested a historical, regional and ethnolinguistic continuity, asserting that "the mummies and skeletons of ancient Egyptians indicate they were similar to the modern Egyptians and other people of the Afroasiatic ethnic grouping."

In his entry in Black Athena Revisted (1996), edited by Mary Lefkowitz & Guy MacLean Rogers, Frank Yurco would note that: "Two seminal studies of Egyptian skeletal material reported continuity from the ancient down to the modern population (Batrawi 1945, 1946). Certainly there was some foreign admixture in Egypt, but basically a homogeneous African population had lived in the Nile Valley from ancient to modern times.” Yurco also considered the Badarians as exhibiting a "mix of North African and Sub-Saharan physical traits", and referenced older analysis of skeletal remains which "showed tropical African elements in the population of the earliest Badarian culture".
