= Aphroditopolite Nome =

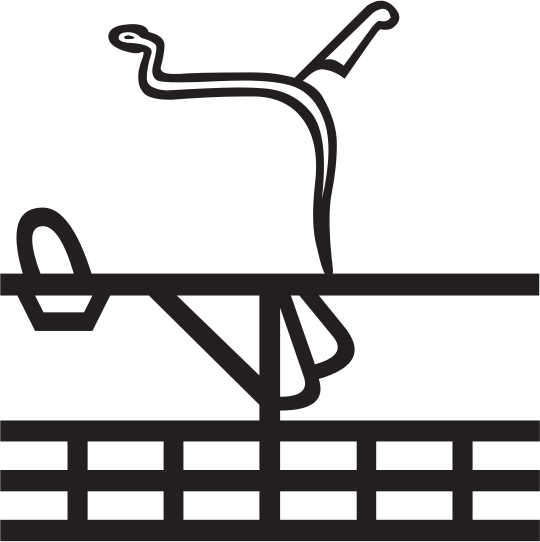
Wadjet nome in hieroglyphs

The Aphroditopolite Nome (also Wadjet) was a nome in ancient Egypt. The administrative region was the tenth nome of Upper Egypt. Its capital was Tjebu. During the Ptolemaic period, the nome's capital city was Aphroditopolis.

Several governors of the province are known. These include Kaikhenet (II) in the Old Kingdom.
