= Kerma (disambiguation) =

Kerma may refer to:

- Kerma, a quantity in radiation physics
- Kerma Basin, a low-lying area by the River Nile in Sudan
- Kerma culture, an ancient civilization in modern-day Sudan
  - Kerma Museum, a museum in northern Sudan
  - Kerma, ancient Nubian city
  - List of monarchs of Kerma
