= Saï =

Island in northern Sudan

- ساي (Arabic)
- Saï island from across the Nile River

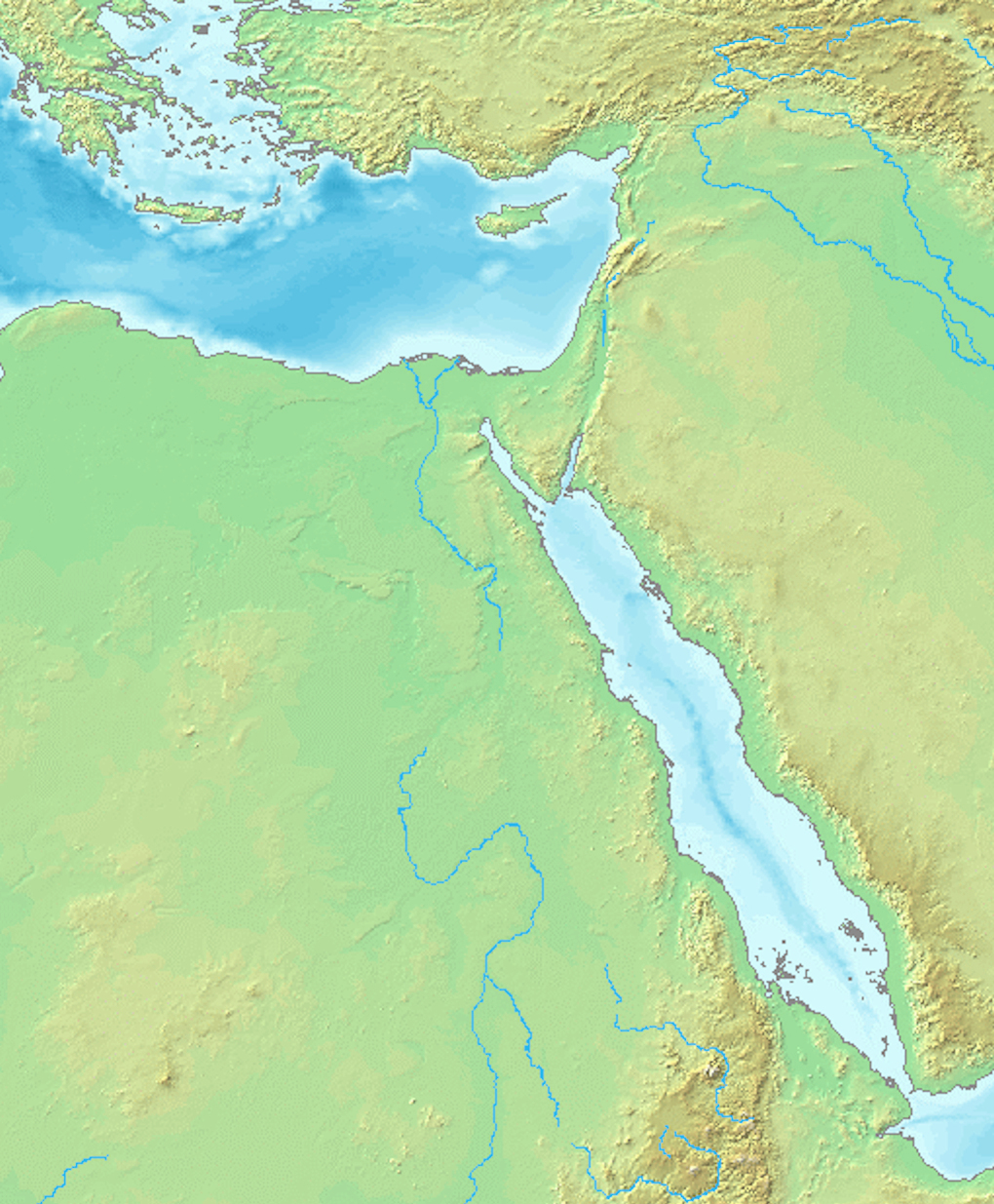
- Location within Northeast Africa Location within Sudan
- 20.7083°N 30.3250°E
- Location: Northern State, Sudan

Saï (Old Nubian: ⲍⲁⲏ, Zaē) is a large island in the Nile in Nubia northern Sudan, situated between the Second and Third Cataracts.

The island.contains archeological remains dating from the Middle Stone Age to the Ottoman period. Saï was an important population center of the Kingdom of Kerma outside it's capital before becoming a major center of Egyptian administration in Kush (Nubia) during the New Kingdom of Egypt. The Egyptian settlement included a fortified town, a sandstone temple, and several administrative buildings. Archeological remains from the island provide evidence of interaction between Nubian and Egyptian societies, including the continuation of Nubian traditions during Egyptian rule.

The island also contains archeological remains associated with the Napata and Meroeitic periods, a medieval Christian church connected with a Nubian bishopric, and an Ottoman fortress constructed in the sixteenth century.

== Geography ==
Saï island lies in the Nile in Northern State, Sudan, within the Nubian region between the second and third cataracts. it lies near the southern boundary of Batn el-Hajar, just south of the granite formations associated with the Dal Cataract. The island is approximately 12 km long and 5.5 km wide, and is among the largest islands in the Nile. It's present day shape developed over time: a channel to the north became dry after the New Kingdom, while the area extending towards the village of Saï Sab became connected to the island at a later date, probably during the post-Meroitic period.

The islands geological landscape reflex the underlying rock formations of the region. pre-cambrian metamorphic rocks and Nubian sandstone form the geological foundation, which is covered in places by a relatively thin layer of more recent Nile sediments. much of the island consist of flat terraces, while Gebel Adou, A sandstone inselberg near its center, forms its most prominent elevated feature. dry river valleys, known as wadis, extend towards both sides of the island.

The surrounding cataract region is characterized by an East-West geological uplift, where the Nile has cut through ancient basement rocks and their overlying formations. These geological features contribute to the islands varied landscape and distinguish it from the surrounding stretches of the Nile Valley.

== History ==
=== Prehistoric occupation ===
Archeological evidence indicates that Saï island was occupied from prehistoric times. The island contains Paleolithic and Neolithic sites, including remains of early human activity and stone tools. Archaeological research has also identified several prehistoric pottery traditions, including the Khartoum, Abkan and pre-Kerma ceramics. the earliest pottery examined in one study dates approximately 7600-4800 BC, documenting changes in manufacturing techniques, clay selection, decoration and vessel forms. These findings provide evidence for the local communities and their cultural connections with other parts of Nubia.

=== Kingdom of Kerma ===
By the middle of the third millennium BC, Saï had become an important population center of the Kingdom of Kerma outside it's capital at Kerma. Its location near the southern end of the Batn el-Haggar placed it in a strategically important position between Northern Nubia and the territory controlled by the Egyptian state. archaeological evidence includes several extensive Kerma-period cemeteries, particularly burials belonging to the Kerma Classic period. The island is considered one of the major settlement centers associated with the Kerma culture outside its capital, although the precise location and layout of its contemporary settlement has not been fully established.

During the early New Kingdom, the island became an important location in the conflict between Egypt and the Kingdom of Egyptian rulers, including Ahmose I, conducted military campaigns in Nubia as they sought to expand their control southwards. Saï's position made it a potential military and logistical base for these campaigns. However the exact circumstances of the Egyptian conquest of the island and establishment of its earliest settlement remains uncertain.

=== Egyptian settlement during the new kingdom ===
During the early Eighteenth Dynasty, Egypt expanded its control into upper Nubia in campaigns against the Kingdom of Kerma, and established a fortified settlement on Saï. Evidence from Saï, including Royal monuments and archaeological remains, indicates Egyptian activity during the reigns of Ahmose I, Amenhotep I, and Thutmose I. The earliest Egyptian occupation may have functioned as a landing space, bridgehead, or supply station for military and administrative activity further south. However, the original layout of this settlement is not known and excavations have not established that it already possessed the large enclosure wall found in the later town.

A larger fortified settlement was established or substantially recognized during the reign of Thutmose III, following the defeat of the Kingdom of Kerma. The town developed into an important administrative center for upper Nubia and also as Kush. Its buildings included a substantial enclosure wall, a sandstone Temple dedicated primarily to Amen-Re, administrative structures and extensive storage facilities. the settlement was organized around an approximately orthogonal layout and contained distinct, residential and administrative areas. Saï became one of the principal centers of Egyptian administration in the region during the Thutmoside period.

The town continued to develop under later 18th dynasty rulers, including Amenhotep II and Amenhotep III. Inscriptions and archaeological objects from the island identify several officials who served in the Egyptian administration of Nubia, including the viceroys of Kush Nehy and Usersatet. Their monuments and inscriptions provide evidence for presence of High-Ranking officials and building projects for the royals.

Pottery recovered from the new kingdom settlement. Also provides evidence of interaction between Egyptian and Nubian communities. Egyptian wheel made vessels were used alongside hand-made pottery produced according to Nubian traditions. some vessels combined Egyptian forms with Nubian decorative techniques. these assemblages indicate that Nubian ceramic traditions continued during Egypt rule and that the material culture of the settlement is not exclusively Egyptian.

The fortified Egyptian town was eventually abandoned as an administrative center towards the end of the New Kingdom. however, archaeological evidence from the southern part of the settlement indicates continued occupation and reuse by Nubian communities during the Meroitic and, post Meroitic and medieval periods.

=== Napatan and Meroitic periods ===
Following the end of Egyptian rule, Saï became part of the successive Kushite kingdoms of Napatan and Meroë. During the Napatan period, the island remained within territory of the Kushite Kingdom, which developed its own political and religious traditions while maintaining connections with archaeological remains from the later Kushite periods include cemeteries and reused architectural material.

Saï was also and important royal site during the Meroitic period. Evidence for Royal activity includes the discovery of stone column capitals bearing of the names of Amanitore and Natakamani, rulers of the Meroitic kingdom. Archaeological investigations have also identified several Meroitic funerary complexes on the island. These discoveries provide evidence for the island's continued importance within the Kushite Kingdom and its regional connections during this period.

Following the end of the Meroitic kingdom, The island continued to be occupied during the post Meroitic period. Archaeological remains include large tumulus cemeteries associated with the X-group culture, including burials dating to the 4th century AD. These burial sites demonstrate the continuation of local Nubian communities and funerary traditions after the decline of the Meroitic political power.

=== Medieval period ===
Saï Island Church

During the medieval period, Saï became part of the Christian Nubian world and was associated with the Kingdom of written records. Identify the island as the seat of Bishopric, indicating it's importance as an ecclesiastical center. Archaeological remains include Christian cemeteries, settlement sites and a substantial church traditionally identified as the cathedral associated with the bishopric. The church's architectural remains include columns and other elements of medieval Nubian Christian architecture.

=== Ottoman period ===
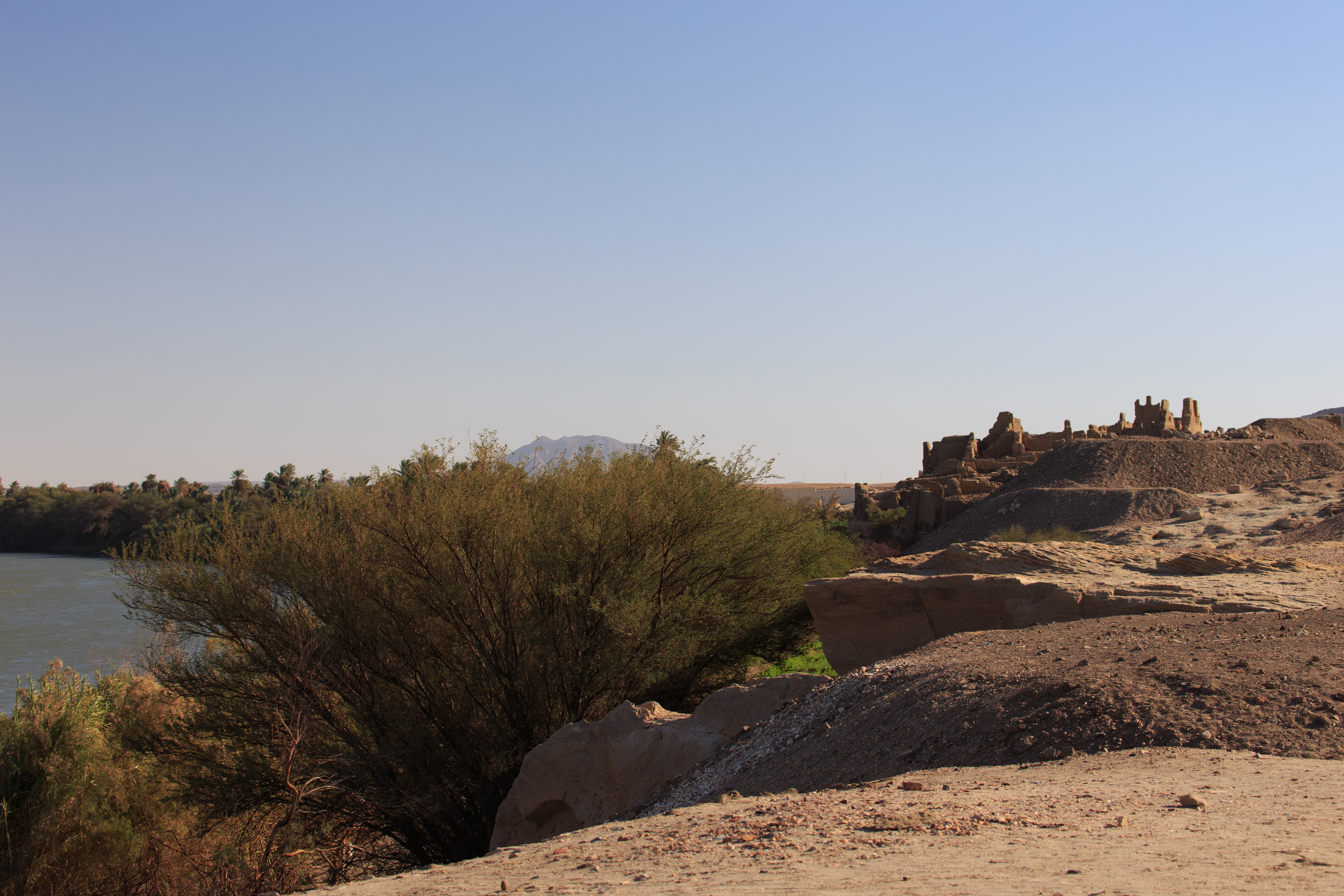
Ruins of the Ottoman fortress

In the late 16th century Saï came under Ottoman control during the expansion of Ottoman power into Nubia. A fortress known as Qalat sai was constructed in 1585 over part of the former New Kingdom town, occupying approximately 1/4 of the area in closed by its ancient walls. the fortress was positioned above the Nile cliffs and served as a military stronghold in the region. it's construction covered and altered parts of the earlier Egyptian settlement, contributing to the preservation and reuse of some ancient architectural remains within the later complex.

The ottoman fortress was destroyed in 1820 by the army of Muhammad Ali during the Egyptian conquest of the region, after which the site was abandoned as a military stronghold.

== Archeological Remains ==
=== New Kingdom fortified town ===
Sai Island, View of the Nile with pharaonic town

The principal archaeological remains on Saï include a fortified Egyptian settlement dating to the Eighteenth Dynasty (c. 1550-1292 BC), located on the eastern side of the island. The town measured approximately 238 m from north to south and 118-120 m from east to west. it's layout included an enclosed wall, a western main gate, streets, mudbrick buildings and a sandstone temple. Its position beside the Nile provided access to the river traffic and may have facilitated the landing and loading of boats.

Archaeological investigations have revealed several stages in the town's development. During the early Eighteenth Dynasty, the settlement appears to have consisted of relatively small structures, workshops, and storage facilities. The extent and organization of this early occupation remains uncertain because only limited archeological remains have survived. A larger fortified settlement developed during the reign of Thutmose III, following the defeat of the Kingdom of Kerma. This phase included substantial enclosure walls, a temple dedicated primarily to Amun-Re and buildings associated with administration and storage.

Excavations in the northern sector designated SAV1 North, were conducted by the Sai island archeological mission between 2008 and 2012. Across nine excavation squares measuring 10 m each, archeologist recorded more than one hundred segments of mudbrick walls and have identified five occupation levels. The most extensively documented phase, level 3, dates from the reign of Thutmose III into the later Eighteenth Dynasty. The remains include several building units situated beside the northern enclosure wall, providing evidence for the development and repeated use of buildings withing the fortified settlement.

A section of the northern enclosure wall was traced for approximately 39.32 m and measured about 4.26 m thick. An outward projection measuring approximately 2.6 by 2.4 m was also identified and interpreted as a tower-like feature. Stratigraphic evidence and associated pottery date this section of the wall to the second half of ThutmoseIII's reign. These remains help establish the construction date and defensive design of the town's northern boundary. The buildings immediately inside the wall differ in arrangement from those in the southern sector, demonstrating that the town's architecture was not uniform across the entire settlement.

=== Temple A ===
Temple A is a sandstone temple located north of the ottoman fortress on the eastern edge of the New Kingdom fortified town, Immediately north of the ottoman fortress of Qalat Sai. The building is approximately 10m wide and 13m long it's original architectural layout is now difficult to reconstruct because most of the structure has disappeared; the surviving remains include the lower stone foundations of the chapels in the western part of the building. the temple was dedicated primarily to Amun-Re and also associated with the deity known as Horus the Bull, Lord of Ta-seti.

Archeological evidence places the temple's principal construction phase in the reign of Thutmose III. Seven foundation deposits were identified during excavations, providing evidence for the buildings date and construction history. These deposits included objects associated with the temples foundation, among them pottery vessels. Objects catalogued from the excavations include a terracotta plate recovered from foundation deposit 2 and miniature terracotta vessels from foundation deposits. The deposits were significant because they provide archeological evidence supplied by its surviving masonry and inscriptions.

A further source for the temple's history is a sandstone pillar bearing the inscription designated S.1. The inscription is associated with Nehy, the viceroy of Kush, and records building activity at Sai in year 25 of Thutmose III. Nehy's involvement connects the temple's construction with the officials responsible for administering Egyptian-controlled Nubia. The inscription is particularly important because it documents royal building activity at the site, although it does not establish when the fortified settlement itself was first founded. The inscription also refers to an earlier brick structure that had collapsed and was to be rebuilt and enlarged in stone; the precise details of the damaged text and the earlier structure's relationship to the surviving temple remains uncertain

The sanctuary was modified during subsequent reigns. During the reign of Amenhotep II, additions were undertaken under the viceroy Usersatet. Amenhotep III was responsible for the temple's final known construction and decoration phase. These successive building phases demonstrate that Temple A was not a single-period monument: it was maintained and developed under several Eighteenth Dynasty Kings. It's dedication to Amun-Re, together with the inscription of a senior Nubian administrator and the evidence of royal building activity, places the temple within the religious and administrative landscape of the Egyptian New Kingdom settlement at Saï

=== Storage installations ===
Archeological excavations have identified extensive storage facilities within the island. particularly in the southern and eastern sectors of the settlement. These installations included rectangular storage rooms, circular solos and underground cellars, indicating that a substantial part of the town was used for storing and managing goods. In the southern sector, SAV1, several rows of rectangular magazines and circular silos were identified in the western part of the settlement. These stood alongside the residential quarter and administrative buildings, including the structure identified as the governors residence (SAF2). The arrangement suggest that storage and administrative buildings occupied a significant area of the fortified town

Further evidence was uncovered in the easter sector, SAV1 East, where excavations between 2013 and 2017 revealed several large underground storage instillations. These were rectangular structures dug into the natural gravel deposits and constructed with mud-brick walls and vaulted roofs. One of the best preserved examples was Feature 15, located within Building A. it measured approximately 5.6 m long and 2.2 m wide and 1.2 m high. Excavated in 2016, the instillation contained more than 80 nearly intact pottery vessels, hundreds of doum-palm fruits, animal bones, showing traces of burning, large quantities of charcoal and ash deposits. The remains provide evidence for the materials sorted or processed in the building, although the precise contents and purpose of every deposit cannot be established from the finds alone.

Feature 15 also contained approximately 200 fragments of clay sealings bearing impressions of scarab seals. These included impressions with the names of Egyptian Rulers Amenhotep I, Hatshepsut and Thutmose III, as well as floral designs. The sealings are particularly important because the represent the first substantial group of seal impressions discovered within Saï. Such objects provide evidence for the sealing and control of containers or goods and offer insight into the administrative activities associated with the storage facilities. Their royal names also helped archeologist establish the chronology of the deposits and the different phases of the buildings use.

The archaeological sequence of Feature 15 indicates that it underwent changes during the eighteenth dynasty. The cellar was initially constructed during the early eighteenth dynasty, before or during the reign of Hatshepsut. It was subsequently used as a storage instillation during the reign of Hatshepsut and early to the middle years of Thutmose III. During the later reign of Thutmose or the reign of Amenhotep II, a wall was identified as Feature 44 was inserted into the cellar as the surrounding Building A was reorganized. The instillation was eventually filled in and abandoned between the reigns of Amenhotep II and Amenhotep III. The sequence shows that the storage area was modified as the town's buildings and administrative organization changed.

Additional storage structures were discovered in the western part of SAV1 Easte. Two rectangular underground cellars, designated features 83 and 85, were excavated beneath the schist-paved floors of larger magazine rooms. Feature 83 measured approximately 3.3 m by 1.8 m and a preserved Hight of about 2m. Its walls were lined with mud bricks, and its roof was constructed as a vault. Although much of the roof had collapsed, sections of the vault and evidence of its original construction survived. Collapsed mud bricks were found inside, together with pottery vessels that have been broken on the floor. The pottery indicates that the final use and abandonment of the cellar took place during the mid-Eighteenth Dynasty. Feature 85 was also identified as a similar storage installation and was dated to approximately the same time as the pottery remains.

== Bibliogrophy ==
- Azim, Michel (1975). "Quatre campagnes de fouilles sur la Forteresse de Saï, 1970–1973. 1ère partie: l'installation pharaonique". Cahiers de Recherches de l'Institut de Papyrologie et d'Égyptologie de Lille, 3, pp. 91–125.
- Gratien, Brigitte (1986). Saï I: La nécropole Kerma. Paris.
- Doyen, Florence (2009). "The New Kingdom Town on Sai Island (Northern Sudan)". Sudan & Nubia, 13, pp. 17–20.
- Budka, Julia (2011). "The Early New Kingdom at Sai Island: Preliminary Results Based on the Pottery Analysis (4th Season 2010)". Sudan & Nubia, 15, pp. 23–33.
- Minault-Gout, Anne (2007). "Les installations du début du Nouvel Empire à Sai: un état de la question". Cahiers de Recherches de l'Institut de Papyrologie et d'Égyptologie de Lille, 26, pp. 275–293.
- Minault-Gout, Anne, and Florence Thill (2012). Saï II: Le cimetière des tombes hypogées du Nouvel Empire (SAC5). Fouilles de l'Institut français d'archéologie orientale du Caire 69. Cairo.
- Budka, Julia, and Florence Doyen (2014). "Living in New Kingdom Towns in Upper Nubia: New Evidence from Recent Excavations on Sai Island". Ägypten und Levante, 22/23, pp. 167–208.
- Budka, Julia (2015). "The Pharaonic Town on Sai Island and Its Role in the Urban Landscape of New Kingdom Kush". Sudan & Nubia, 19, pp. 40–53.
- Adenstedt, Ines (2016). Reconstructing Pharaonic Architecture in Nubia: The Case Study of SAV1, Sai Island. Contributions to the Archaeology of Egypt, Nubia and the Levant 3. Vienna.
- Budka, Julia (ed.) (2017). AcrossBorders I: The New Kingdom Town of Sai Island, Sector SAV1 North. Contributions to the Archaeology of Egypt, Nubia and the Levant 4. Vienna: Austrian Academy of Sciences Press.
- Budka, Julia (2017). "Pyramid Cemetery SAC5, Sai Island, Northern Sudan: An Update Based on Fieldwork from 2015–2017". Ägypten und Levante, 27, pp. 107–130.
- Budka, Julia (2020). AcrossBorders 2: Living in New Kingdom Sai. Austrian Academy of Sciences Press, Vienna.
- D'Ercole, Giulia, Julia Budka, Johannes H. Sterba, Elena A. A. Garcea, and Dieter Mader (2017). "The Successful 'Recipe' for a Long-Lasting Tradition: Nubian Ceramic Assemblages from Sai Island (Northern Sudan) from Prehistoric Times to the New Kingdom Period". Antiquity, 91(355), pp. 24–42.

== See also ==
- Arabian-Nubian Shield
- Nubian Sandstone
