= C-Group culture =

C. 2400–1550 BCE Lower Nubian archaeological culture

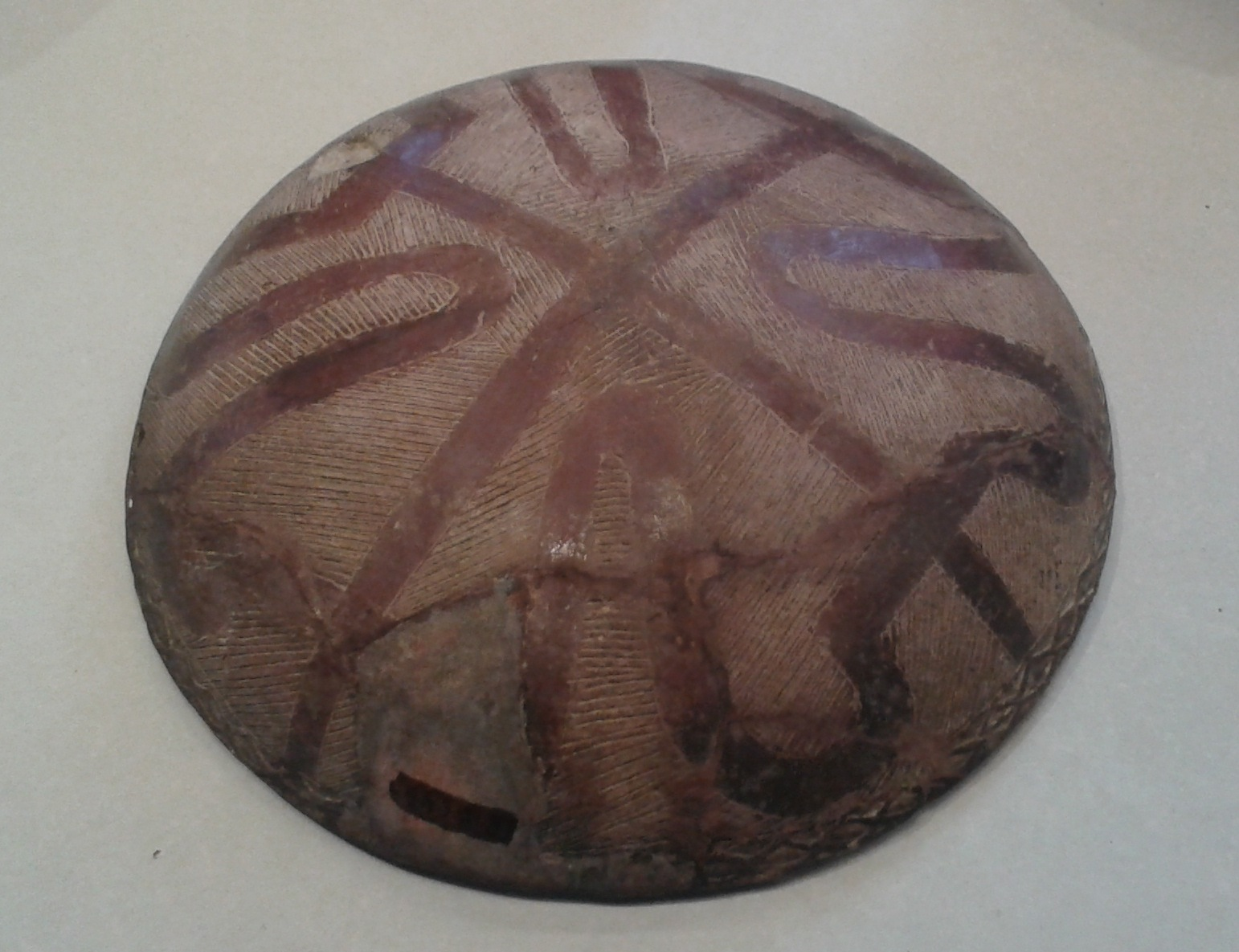
- Bowl of the C-Group, Musée du Louvre
- Geographical range: Nubia in Northeast Africa
- Period: Bronze Age
- Dates: c. 2400BCE – c. 1550 BCE
- Preceded by: A-Group culture B-Group culture
- Followed by: Middle Kingdom
- Defined by: George Andrew Reisner

The C-Group culture is an archaeological culture found in Lower Nubia, which dates from c. 2400 BCE to c. 1550 BCE. It was named by George A. Reisner. With no central site and no written evidence about what these people called themselves, Reisner assigned the culture a letter. The C-Group arose after Reisner's A-Group and B-Group cultures, and around the time the Old Kingdom was ending in Ancient Egypt.

== Overview ==
While today A-Group and B-Group are seen as being a continuation of the same group, C-Group is considered as the product of distinct Saharan pastoralists. The C-Group is marked by its distinctive pottery, and for its tombs. Early C-Group tombs consisted of a simple "stone circle" with the body buried in a depression in the centre. The tombs later became more elaborate with the bodies being placed in a stone lined chamber, and then the addition of an extra chamber on the east for offerings.

The origins of the C-Group are still debated. Some scholars see it largely as having evolved from the A/B-Group. Others think it more likely that the C-Group was brought by invaders or migrants that mingled with the local culture, with the C-Group perhaps originating in the then rapidly drying Sahara.

The C-Group were farmers and semi-nomadic herders keeping large numbers of cattle in an area that is today too arid for such herding. Originally they were believed to be a peaceful people due to the lack of weapons in tombs; however, daggers, short swords and battle-axes were found in C-Group graves. Their settling around the forts built by the ancient Egyptians was seen as further evidence.

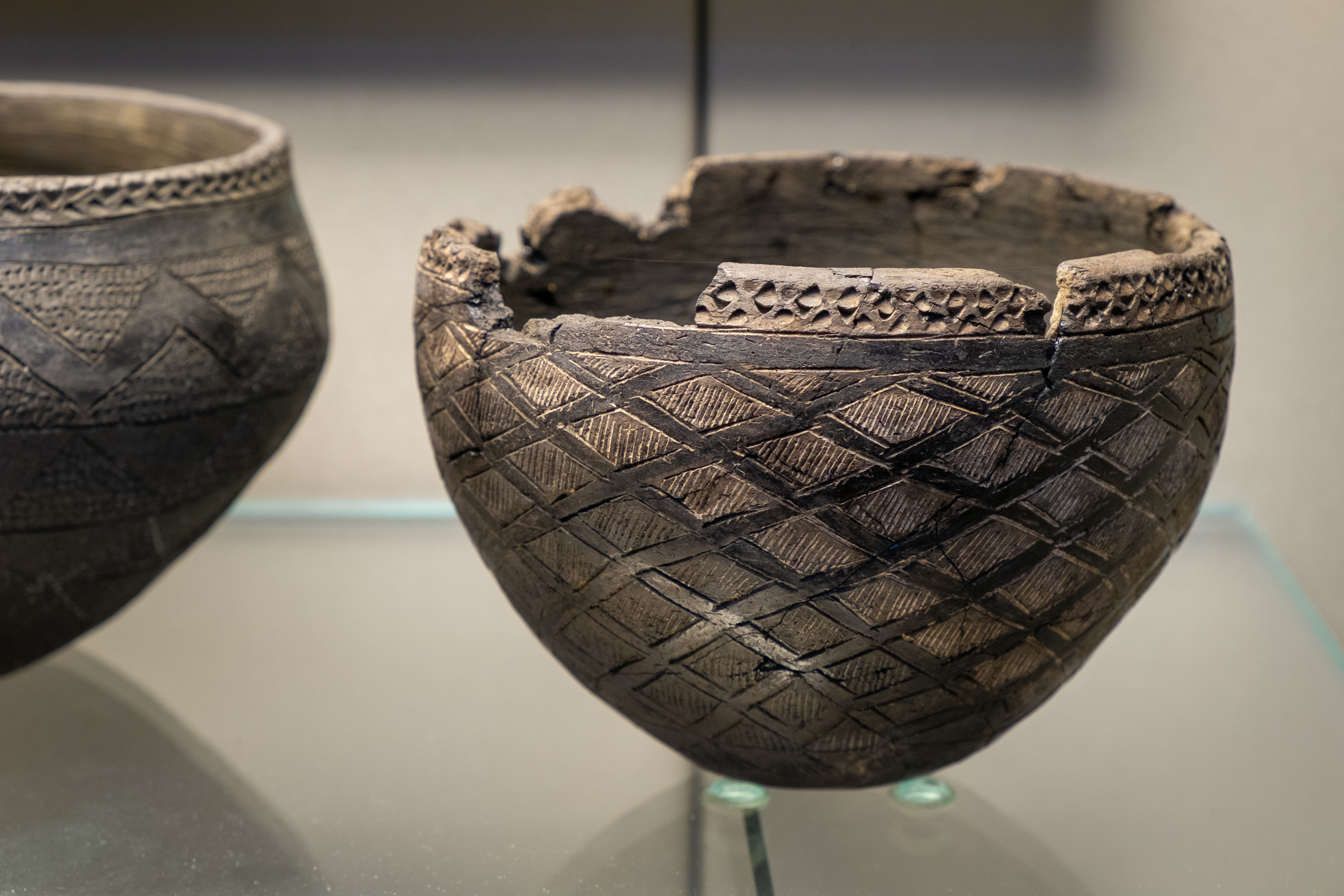
Pottery of the C-Group people, 2300–1600 BCE, Faras.

Most of what is known about the C-Group peoples comes from Lower Nubia and the Dongola Reach. The northern border of the C-Group was around el-Kubanieh near Aswan. The southern border is still uncertain, but C-Group sites have been found as far south as Eritrea.

During the Egyptian Sixth Dynasty, Lower Nubia is described as consisting of a number of small states, three of which are named: Setju, Wawat, and Irjet. At this same time in Upper Nubia the Kingdom of Kerma was emerging. The exact relation between the C-Group and Kerma is uncertain, but early Kerma shows definite similarities to the C-Group culture and the Pan-Grave culture.

Under the Middle Kingdom much of the C-Group lands in Lower Nubia were conquered by Egypt; after the Egyptians left, Kerma expanded north controlling the region. Starting with the conquest of Nubia by Egypt under Tuthmosis I in the late 16th century BCE, the C-Group merged with the Egyptians.

== Burial customs ==
Early Kerma tumuli were the chosen burial method for Nubians, Pan-Graves, and the C-group culture. The C-group tumuli were graves built in a "stone circle" using the "dry stone masonry" technique with an offering chapel decorated with cattle illustrations. However, each culture differed in the structure of the tumuli. The Nubian's tumuli were a shallow round grave and included animal bones. Pan-Grave tumuli were constructed with large black stones and small white stones in an alternating pattern. The C-group culture was pastoral, with cattle being an essential part of their daily activities, funerary practices, and religion. Many "standing slabs" had illustrations of cattle and cattle horns with fine pottery found in the chapel.

In prehistoric times, there had been little distinction between Egyptian and Nubian burial practices, as both were laid in a contracted position in shallow graves. However, as time continues, Nubian cultures continued the contracted body tradition. In contrast, in Egyptian culture, the deceased was placed in an extended position.

As Egypt gained control of Kerma in the New Kingdom, Egyptian culture began to spread throughout Lower Nubia. The C-groups cultures now laid the deceased supine, shown throughout the Ancient Tekhet, Fadrus cemetery.

In the Second Intermediate Period of Egypt, group burials were favored, and this was a trend that was seen in C-group burials. Along with the previously beloved decorations relating to cattle are absent with nearly entirely Egyptian pottery and stone vessels. However, many of their tombs lacked Egyptian funerary goods. The lack of funerary goods could suggest that the C-group's adaptation to Egyptian culture was forced or those buried at Fadrus were simply of "low socioeconomic status."

== Language ==
According to Peter Behrens (1981) and Marianne Bechaus-Gerst (2000), linguistic evidence indicates that the C-Group peoples spoke Afro-Asiatic languages of the Berber branch. This thesis rests on somewhat sketchy and numerically insufficient lexical evidence. Recent evidence suggests that the C-Group peoples spoke an Afro-Asiatic language of the Cushitic branch (with peoples to the south in Upper Nubia possibly speaking Nilo-Saharan languages), and that the closest relative of the C-Group language is the Beja language spoken in the Red Sea coast.

== Pastoralism and Economic Practices ==
The C-Group culture was primarily centered around cattle herding, which was crucial for their economy, diet, and social structure. Cattle provided important resources such as milk, blood, and hides, which were essential for food, clothing, and other daily necessities. Cattle imagery appears in C-Group art, including pottery and stelae, and was significant in funerary practices, emphasizing their economic and cultural importance.

The C-Group people led a semi-nomadic lifestyle, settling in small, temporary dwellings such as huts or tents. Their mobility was influenced by environmental factors, particularly the availability of grazing land and water. This pastoral lifestyle is reflected in their material culture, which included portable items suitable for transient living, such as small jars designed for liquid storage, rather than larger grain storage vessels typically found in agricultural societies.

Despite periods of Egyptian domination, the C-Group maintained its pastoral lifestyle. They supplied Egyptian garrisons with livestock products like milk and meat while engaging in trade networks that brought Egyptian goods, such as pottery and amulets, into their society. These interactions demonstrate the C-Group's ability to navigate relationships with powerful neighboring states, preserving their cultural identity while participating in regional trade. Furthermore, the C-Group occupied a key position in trade routes, often acting as intermediaries between Egypt and sub-Saharan Africa, which likely contributed to their prosperity during certain periods.

== Ceramics ==
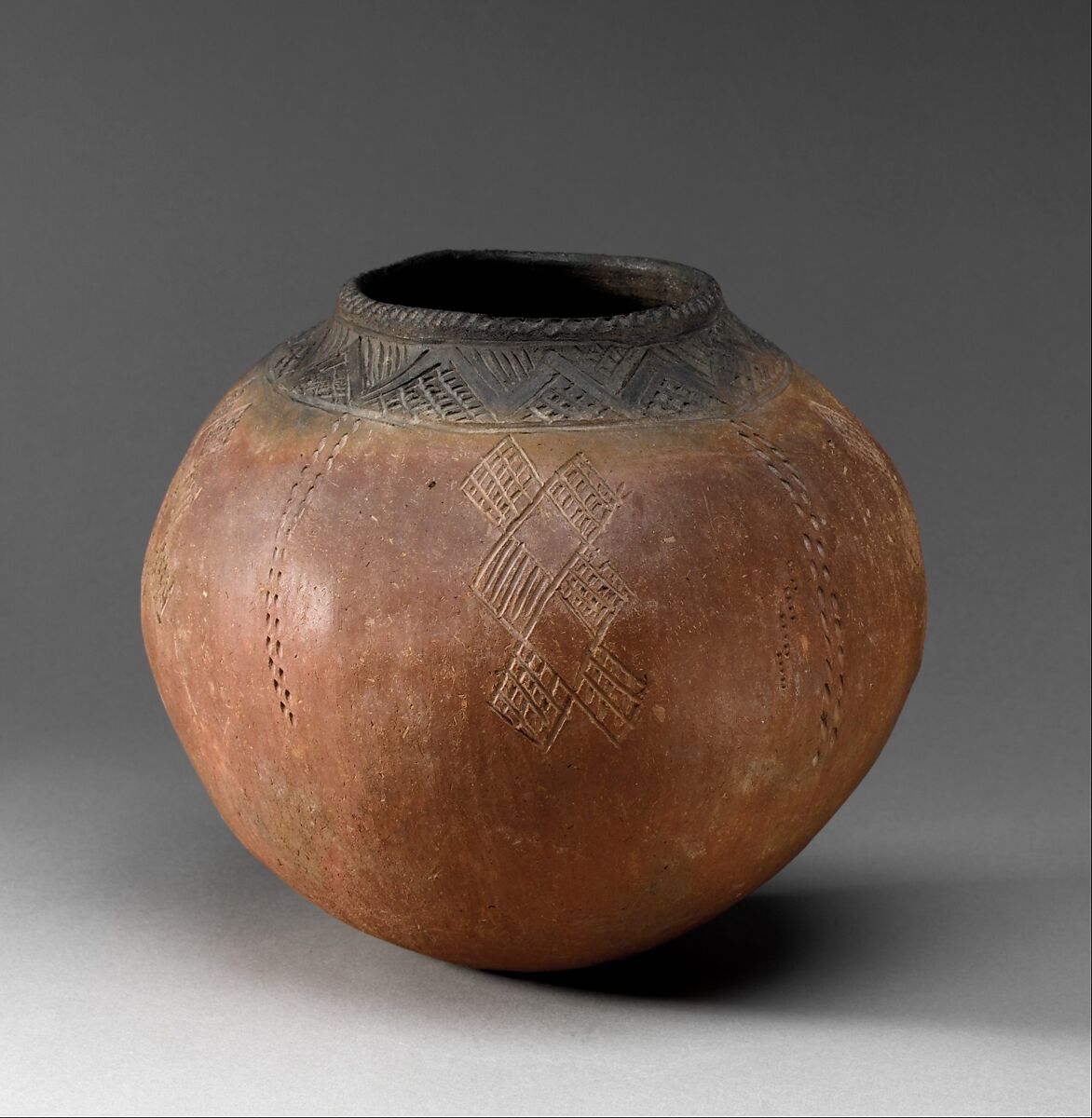
The handmade spherical storage pot features smooth surfaces, with a blackened rim and interior, and is decorated with incised lines, opposing hatched triangles, and columns of lozenges and dots on its body.

C-Group pottery is one of the most distinctive elements of their material culture. The pottery is characterized by intricate incised decorations, often depicting cattle and herding activities, underscoring the cultural and symbolic significance of livestock within their society. These designs reflect the C-Group's pastoral identity and highlight their connection between daily life, art, and spiritual practices.

The utilitarian aspects of C-Group ceramics are also important. Pottery such as small jars for liquid storage was well-suited to the needs of a semi-nomadic lifestyle, where portability and functionality were prioritized. Large containers for grain storage, common in agricultural societies, are notably absent, further emphasizing the C-Group's reliance on cattle-based subsistence.

In funerary contexts, pottery served both practical and ritual purposes. The practice of "killing" pottery, intentionally breaking or penetrating vessels, was a common funerary ritual and likely held symbolic significance. This practice represented offerings or marked transitions between the material and spiritual realms, reinforcing the spiritual importance of ceramics in C-Group burial customs.

The exchange between the C-Group and Egypt is reflected in Egyptian pottery in C-Group graves, huge jars used for transporting goods such as wine and oil. Conversely, C-Group pottery has been found in Egyptian archaeological sites, indicating a bidirectional cultural exchange. This interaction not only influenced C-Group ceramic traditions but also contributed to the preservation of distinctive C-Group artistic features, showing a balance between external influence and cultural continuity.
