= Kerma Museum =

Archaeological site museum in Kerma, Sudan

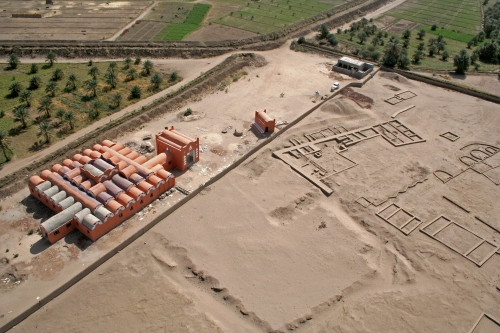
- The Kerma site museum
- Established: 2008
- Location: Archeological site of Kerma, Sudan
- Coordinates: 19°36′2.89″N 30°24′35.03″E
- Type: Archaeological collection
- Website: kerma.ch/en/musee

The Kerma Museum is an archeological site museum located in front of the Western Deffufa on the archaeological site of Kerma, in the Northern State of Sudan. It opened in 2008 and contains many archaeological items removed from the Kerma culture, as well as a section focusing on the Christian and Islamic history of the region.

The museum has become a major cultural venue for the inhabitants of Kerma, who value its role in enhancing Nubian history and contributing to the region's development. North of the museum, there is a small hotel and garden for tourists, and to the south, a cultural centre for Nubian studies was planned for construction.

The museum presents a panorama overview of Sudanese archaeology, is based on the fieldwork and research conducted by the Swiss Archaeological Mission.The site attracts a high number of visitors, with annual attendance exceeding 30,000 people.

== Architecture ==
The building of the museum is inspired by the traditional Nubian vaulted roof. The distinctive building was designed by the international Sudanese architect, Dr. Abdullah Sabbar, who is originally from the Nubian region.

== Displays ==
The museum contains artefacts of the main periods of the Kerma culture: Prehistory, Kingdoms of Kerma, Napata and Meroë.

The highlight of the Kerma Museum are seven black granite statues uncovered in a ditch at the nearby site of Dukki Gel in 2003 by an archaeological team headed by Charles Bonnet. Deliberately broken, but in an excellent state of preservation, in the central room of the Museum are displayed the entirely reassembled statues portraying the Nubian Pharaohs Taharqa, Tanwetamani, Senkamanisken, Anlamani, and Aspelta, who ruled Egypt in the 25th Dynasty.

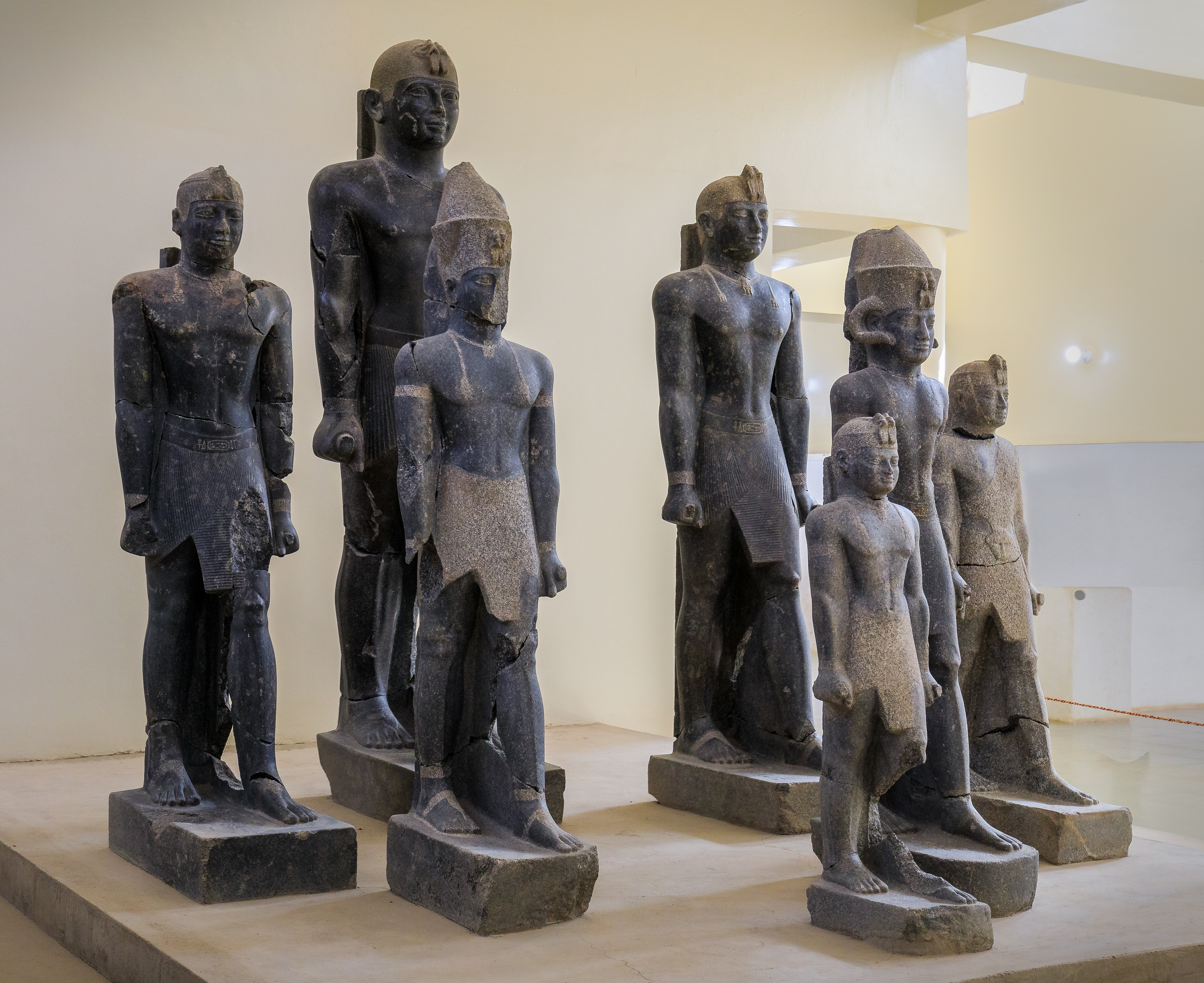
Statues of various rulers of the late 25th Dynasty–early Napatan period: Tantamani, Taharqa (rear), Senkamanisken, again Tantamani (rear), Aspelta, Anlamani, again Senkamanisken. Kerma Museum.

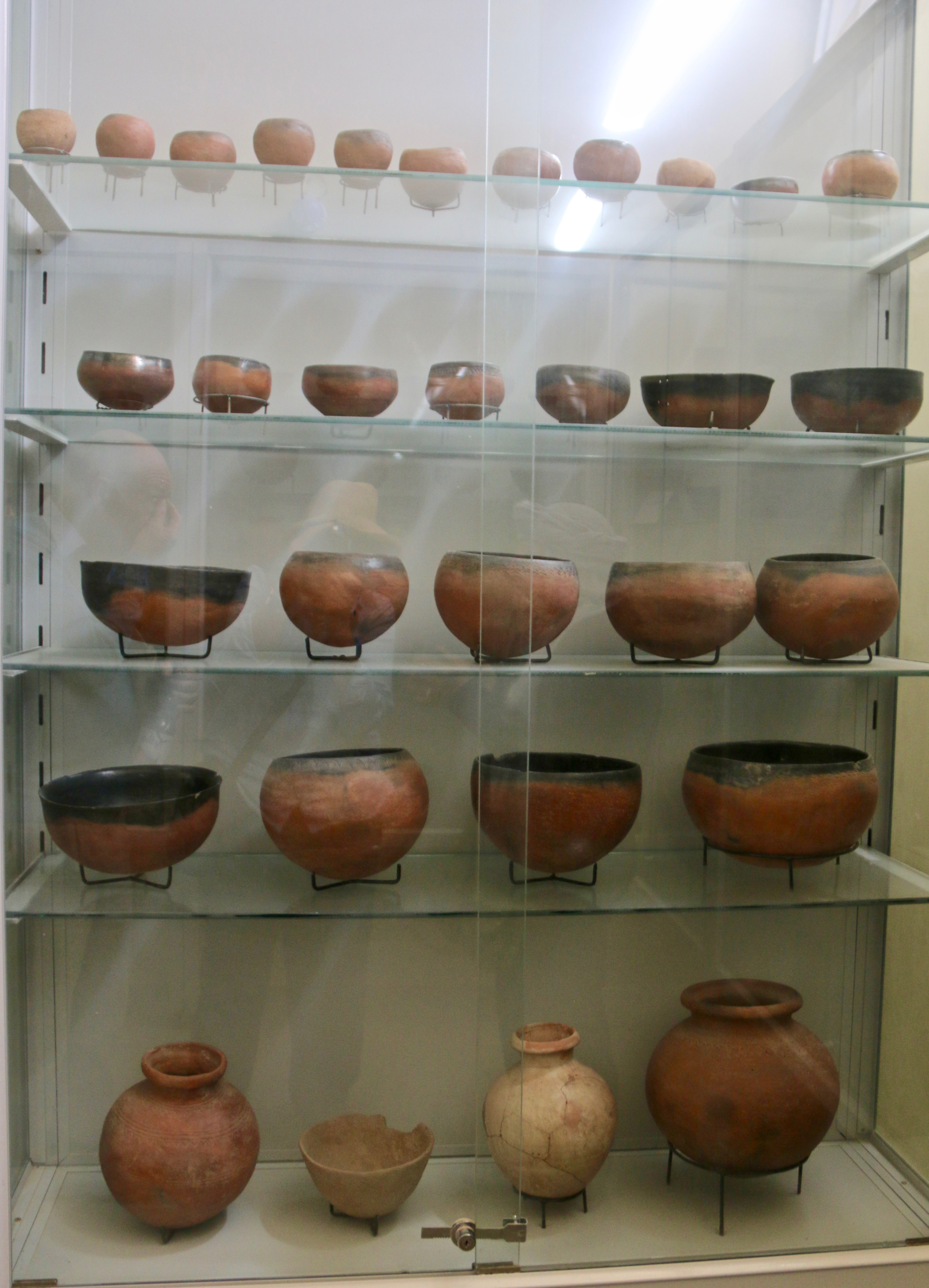
Pottery, Kerma Museum, Kerma, Sudan
