= Western Deffufa =

Oldest man-made structure in Africa

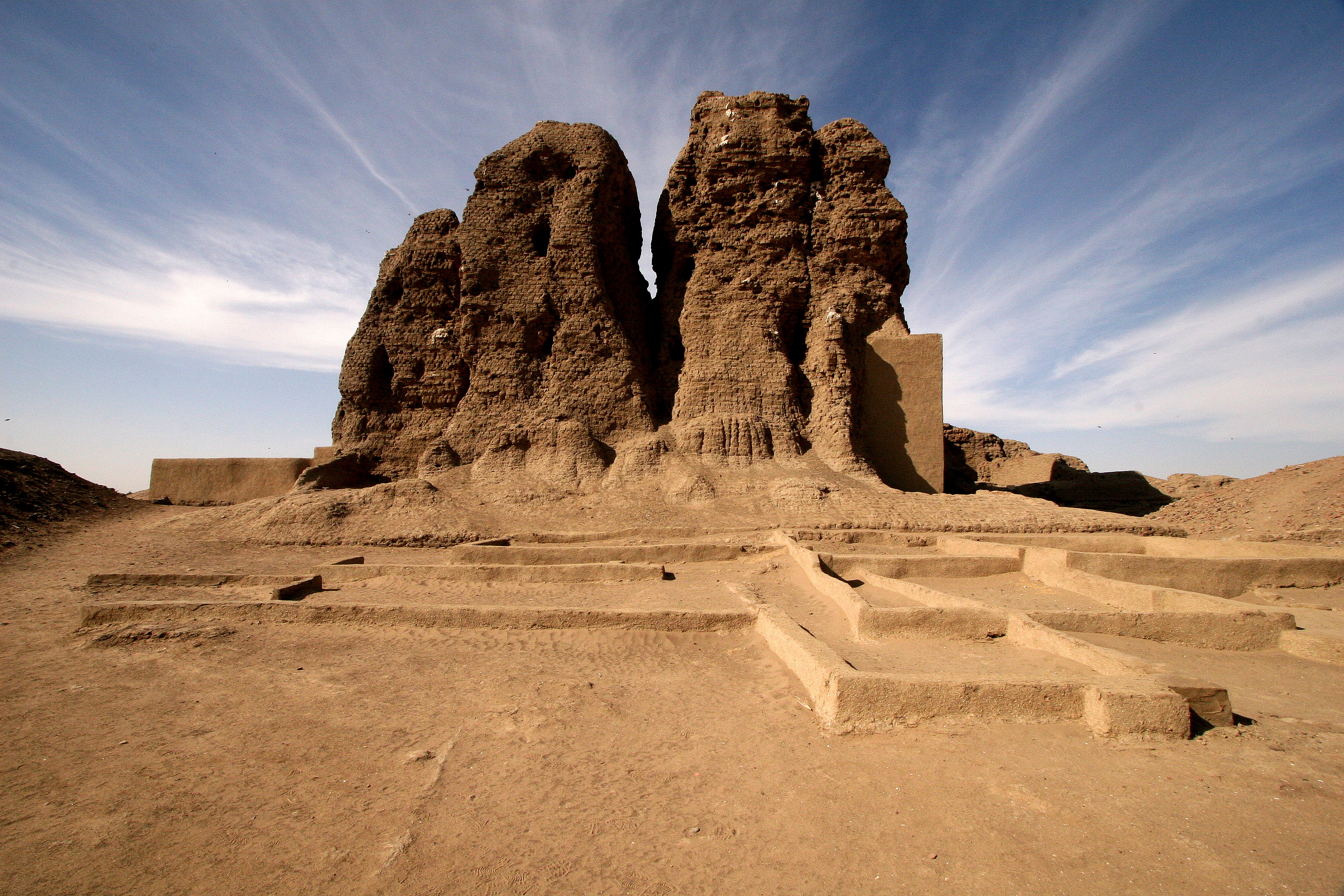
- The temple in 2009

- Location in Sudan
- Type: Temple
- Location: Northern State, Sudan

History
- Built: c. 2500 BC

Site notes
- Material: Mudbrick
- Height: c. 20 meters

The Western Deffufa, located in the ancient city of Kerma in northern Sudan, is one of the oldest known monumental structures in the Nile Valley. The existing building was constructed after 1750 BC, during the Classic Period of the Kerma culture. Rising about 20 meters (65 feet) high, it was built entirely from sun-dried mudbricks. Inside, the structure consists of a series of chambers and courtyards, thought to have been used for religious activities, rituals, and ceremonies central to the Kerma civilization. The word "Deffufa" comes from the Nubian language, referring to buildings made of mudbrick, which were common Kerma’s architectural style. An early version of the Western Deffufa previously existed during the Early Period of the Kerma culture (c. 2400-2000 BC), but little is known about its form.

The Western Deffufa has been the focus of significant archaeological interest since its discovery in the early 20th century. Excavations led by Charles Bonnet and his team have revealed much of the site's layout and have uncovered numerous artifacts, including pottery, religious icons, and tools, all of which offer insight into the daily and spiritual life of the Kerma civilization.
