= Fadrus =

In archaeology, Fadrus refers to a cemetery excavated in Lower Nubia close to a place once called Hillet Fadrus or Qadrus. It was lying in the district of Debeira-East. The cemetery was excavated in the early 1960s by a team of archaeologists from Denmark, Finland, Norway and Sweden, hence the expedition was called The Scandinavian Joint Expedition to Sudanese Nubia. The excavations were part of an international rescue program as the building of the Aswan Dam flooded this area shortly after. The area is composed of 690 tombs ranging from interments without grave goods to decorated tombs-chapels.

680 burials were excavated at Fadrus. They date from the beginning to the end of the 18th Dynasty of the Egyptian New Kingdom. The burials are mostly simple shaft tombs with a single body and some funerary goods. In 128 burials were found remains of coffins, otherwise the people were buried with personal adornments, with toilet equipment, weapons and many pottery vessels. Metal fittings found belong most likely to objects made of organic material. Many of them might once have belong to furniture.

Fadrus was in the Egyptian New Kingdom occupied by Egyptians. It is not known whether the burials belonged to Nubians or Egyptians. The burial customs are close to contemporary Egyptian customs of people of not high social standing.
