= Doukki Gel =

Ancient Nubian settlement in Sudan

- Geographical range: Nubia, Sudan
- Period: Bronze Age
- Dates: c. 1800 BC–400 AD
- Preceded by: Kerma culture

Doukki Gel, or Dukki Gel, was an ancient Nubian settlement. Dukki Gel was inhabited between 1800 BC to 400 AD and was occupied by Kerma rulers around 1700 BC during the Classical Kerma period, and later by Ancient Egyptian and Nubian officials during the new kingdom period. The settlement is located less than 1 kilometre (0.62 mi) south of the city of Kerma, and shows distinctive Sub Saharan influences architecturally distinct from the architecturally kushite Kerma with more rounded structures.

During the Egyptian conquest in the new kingdom, the third pharaoh of the 18th Dynasty of Egypt Thutmose I founded a new city neighbouring Dukki Gel just North of it, Hatshepsut rebuilt the town during her reign.

== Etymology ==
Doukki Gel means "red hill" in a Nubian dialect and was named by archaeologists.

== Fortifications and castles ==
When the military commanders of Thutmose I reached Dokki Gel in the early 15th century BC, they discovered the city. The architecture differed from the Egyptian models, and the military structures must have been awe inspiring to the Egyptian commanders and unseen in Egypt.
