= Batn-El-Hajar =

Segment of the Nile River in Sudan

Coordinates: 21°01′0″N 30°35′0″E

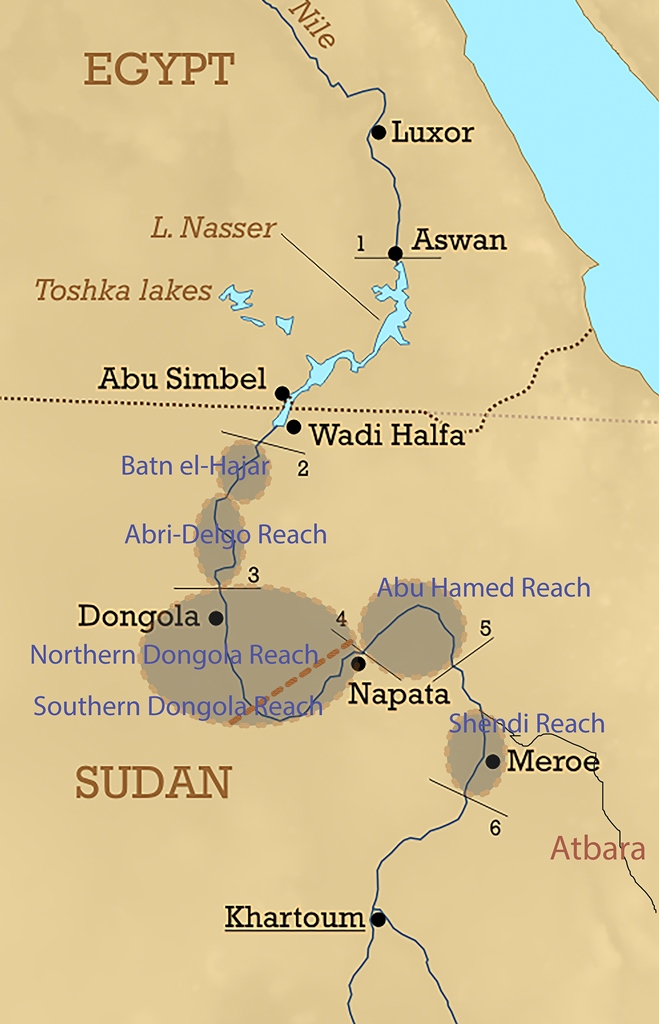
Physiographic zones corresponding to distinct Reaches in the Nile

Batn-El-Hajar or Belly of Stones is a reach of approximately 160 km in length stretching from the Dal Cataract of the Nile downriver to the now under Lake Nubia submerged Second Cataract in present-day Sudan.

== History ==
Batn-El-Hajar is a barren and granite-rich landscape limiting arable soil and, thus, sparsely inhabited. It was the traditional border between Upper Nubia and Lower Nubia. In this area are a number of important A-Group and Meroitics archaeological sites.
