= Kerma culture =

Ancient Sudanese kingdom

Coordinates: 19.600802°N 30.409731°E

- c. 2500 BC–c. 1500 BC
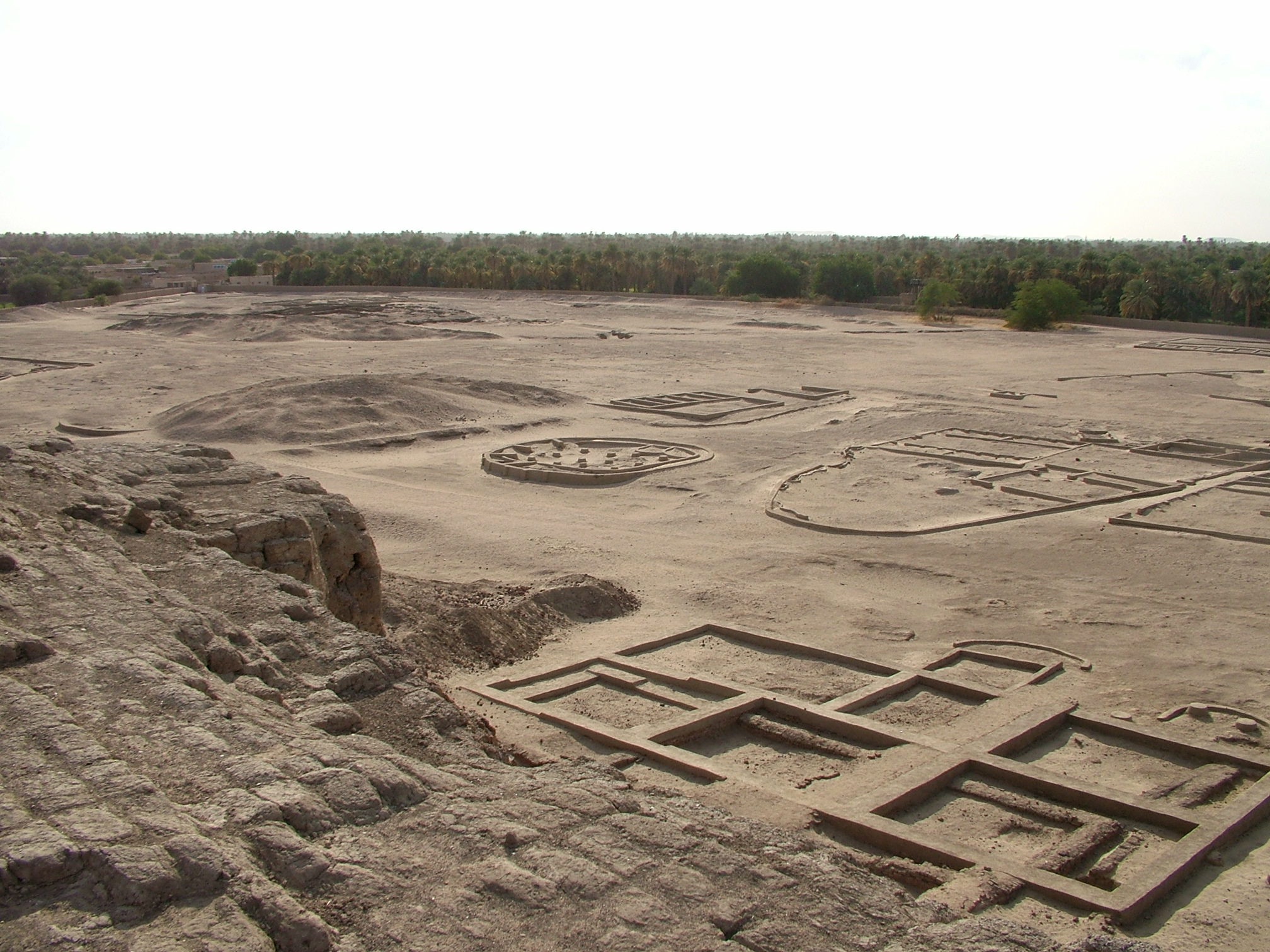
- Kerma
- Capital: Kerma
- Government: Monarchy
- hkꜣw
  - c. 1900 BC: Kaa
- History
  - Established: c. 2500 BC
  - Egyptian conquest: c. 1500 BC
Preceded by	Succeeded by
Pre-Kerma culture	New Kingdom of Egypt

The Kerma culture or the Kingdom of Kerma was an early civilization centered in Kerma, Sudan, in ancient Nubia. The culture developed from around 2500 BC, reaching its peak between 1750 BC and 1500 BC. The Kerma culture was based in the southern part of Nubia, or "Upper Nubia" (in parts of present-day northern and central Sudan), and later extended its reach northward into Lower Nubia and the border of Egypt. The polity seems to have been one of a number of Nile Valley states during the Middle Kingdom of Egypt. The Kerma civilization was an ethnic melting pot, with origins tied to a complex web of cultures native to both the Sahara, and, farther south, parts of Central Africa, as well as to peoples originating from the Levant. In the Kingdom of Kerma's latest phase, lasting from about 1700 to 1500 BC, it absorbed the Sudanese kingdom of Sai and became a sizable, populous kingdom rivalling Egypt. Around 1500 BC, it was absorbed into the New Kingdom of Egypt, but rebellions continued for centuries. By the eleventh century BC, the more-Egyptianized Kingdom of Kush emerged, possibly from Kerma, and regained the region's independence from Egypt.

== Site and periodisation ==
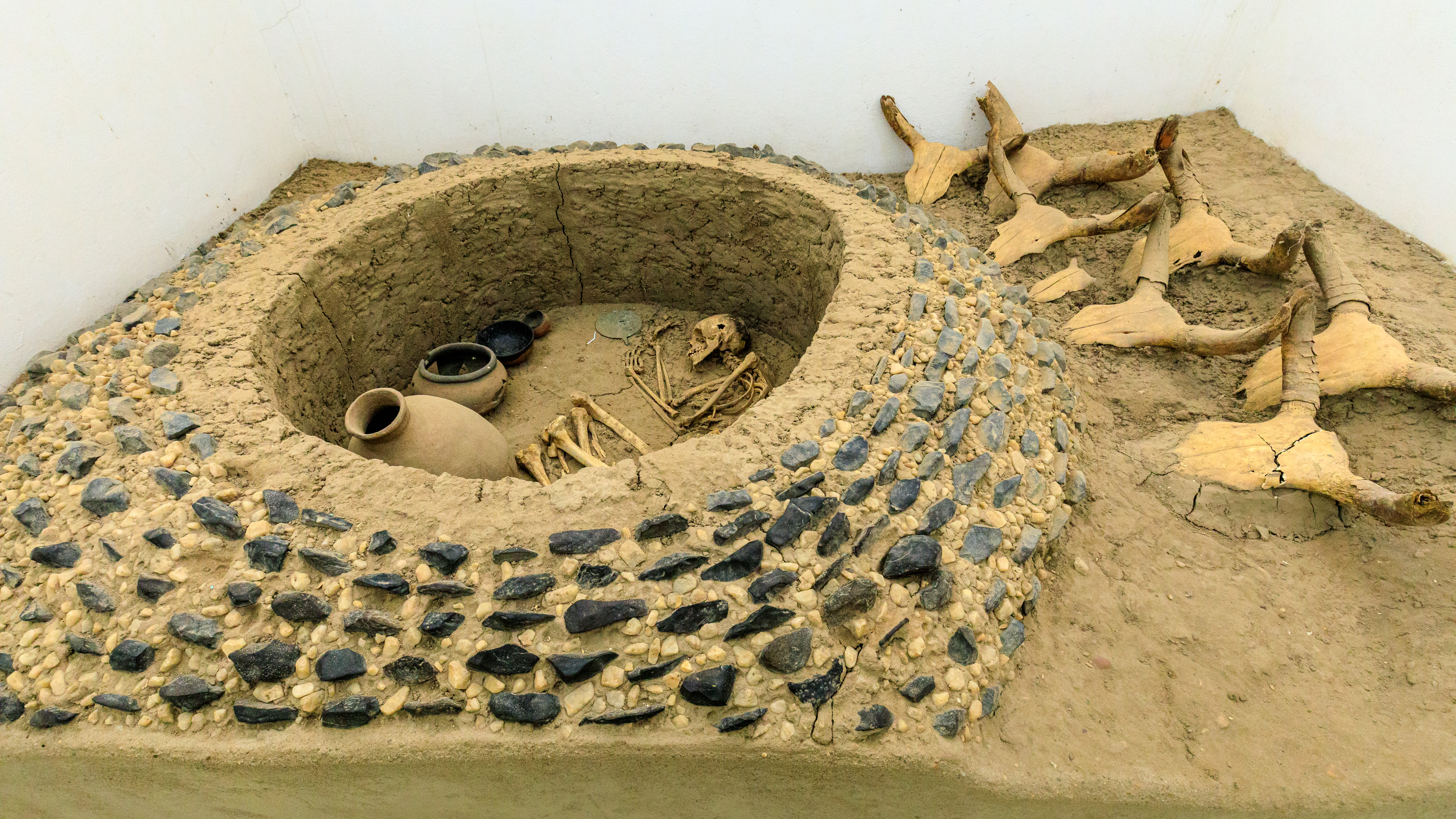
Tumulus from Kerma c. 2450 BC, National Museum of Sudan

The primary site of Kerma that forms the heart of the Kingdom of Kerma includes both an extensive town and a cemetery consisting of large tumuli. The level of affluence at the site demonstrated the power of the Kingdom of Kerma, especially during the Second Intermediate Period when the Kermans threatened the southern borders of Egypt.

The periodisation of Kerma is based on ceramics and other archaeological findings, and roughly matches Egyptian periodisation. The periods are: Early Kerma (2500–2000 BC, contemporary with the late Old Kingdom and First Intermediate Period in Egypt), Middle Kerma (2000–1750 BC, contemporary with the Middle Kingdom), Classic Kerma (1750–1500 BC, contemporary with the Second Intermediate Period), and Late or Post-Kerma (after 1500 BC, during the 18th Dynasty).

== History ==
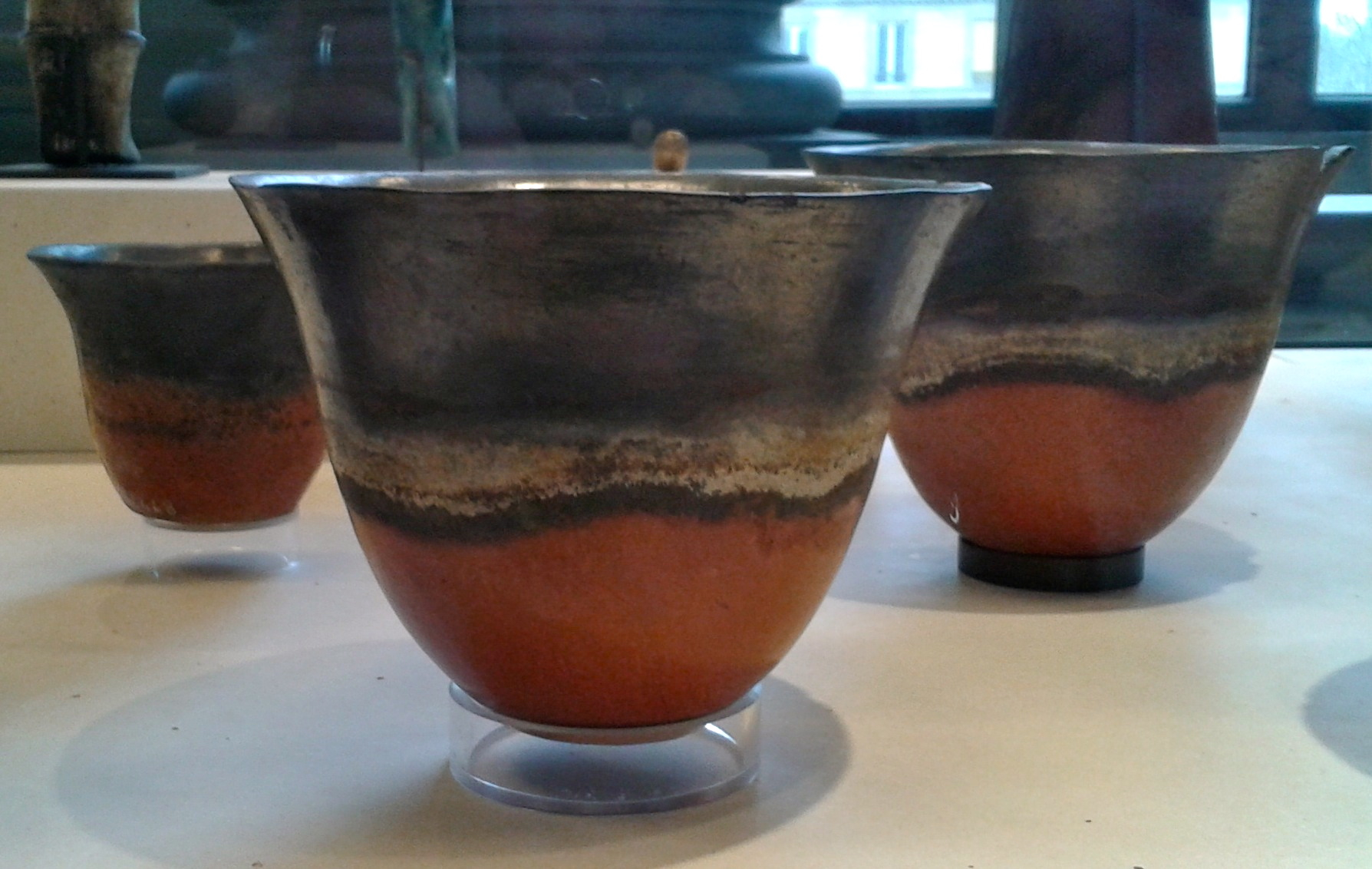
Vessels from Sai island, Kerma culture, c. 2500-1500 BC. On display at the Musée du Louvre.

=== Pre-Kerma culture and Early Kerma ===
The Kerma culture was preceded by the pre-Kerma culture, which developed between 3500 BC and 2500 BC in Upper Nubia. Evidence suggests that the pre-Kerma culture bore statelets and small kingdoms, fewer in number than the A-Group culture in Lower Nubia, but likely larger polities. Upper Nubia had contact with the Egyptian Old Kingdom (c. 2700–2200 BC) during its control of Lower Nubia, as suggested by epigraphic evidence as well as evidence from Aniba, which also indicate the presence of early Nubian regional rulers. It appears that they were initially loyal to the kings of Egypt.

The earliest settlement in the area of Kerma dates from the pre-Kerma period and was located under the later Kerma period cemetery. The pre-Kerma settlement was composed of wooden structures delineated by postholes, with storage pits, cattle pens, two small rectangular buildings and fifty round huts. The site was surrounded by wooden palisades and earthen ramparts or walls.

==== Early Kerma ====
The settlement at Kerma grew from a small, newly-founded fortified village in the Early Kerma period (2500–2000 BC), to a fortified settlement of 3 hectares (ha) (30,000 m^{2}) in the Middle Kerma period (2000–1750 BC).

The Gash Group, a Neolithic culture that flourished from 3000 to 1800 BC in Eritrea and the Eastern Sudan, had contacts with Kerma during the whole period of its development. Kerma elements occurred along the whole stratigraphic sequence at Mahal Teglinos, the main site of the Gash Group. For many centuries, the Gash people were included in the circuit of interchange between Egypt and the southern regions of the Nile valley, so Mahal Teglinos became an important commercial partner of the Kerma state. This trade activity clearly contributed to the rise of complex societies in the region.

By 2300 BC, the Early C-Group culture was also appearing in Lower Nubia, most probably arriving from Dongola Reach (near Kerma). Thus, by the second millennium BC, Kerma was the centre of a large kingdom, probably the first in the Eastern Sudan, that rivalled Egypt. As the Old Kingdom declined and collapsed, Kerma capitalised and expanded north to Aswan.

=== Middle and Classic Kerma ===
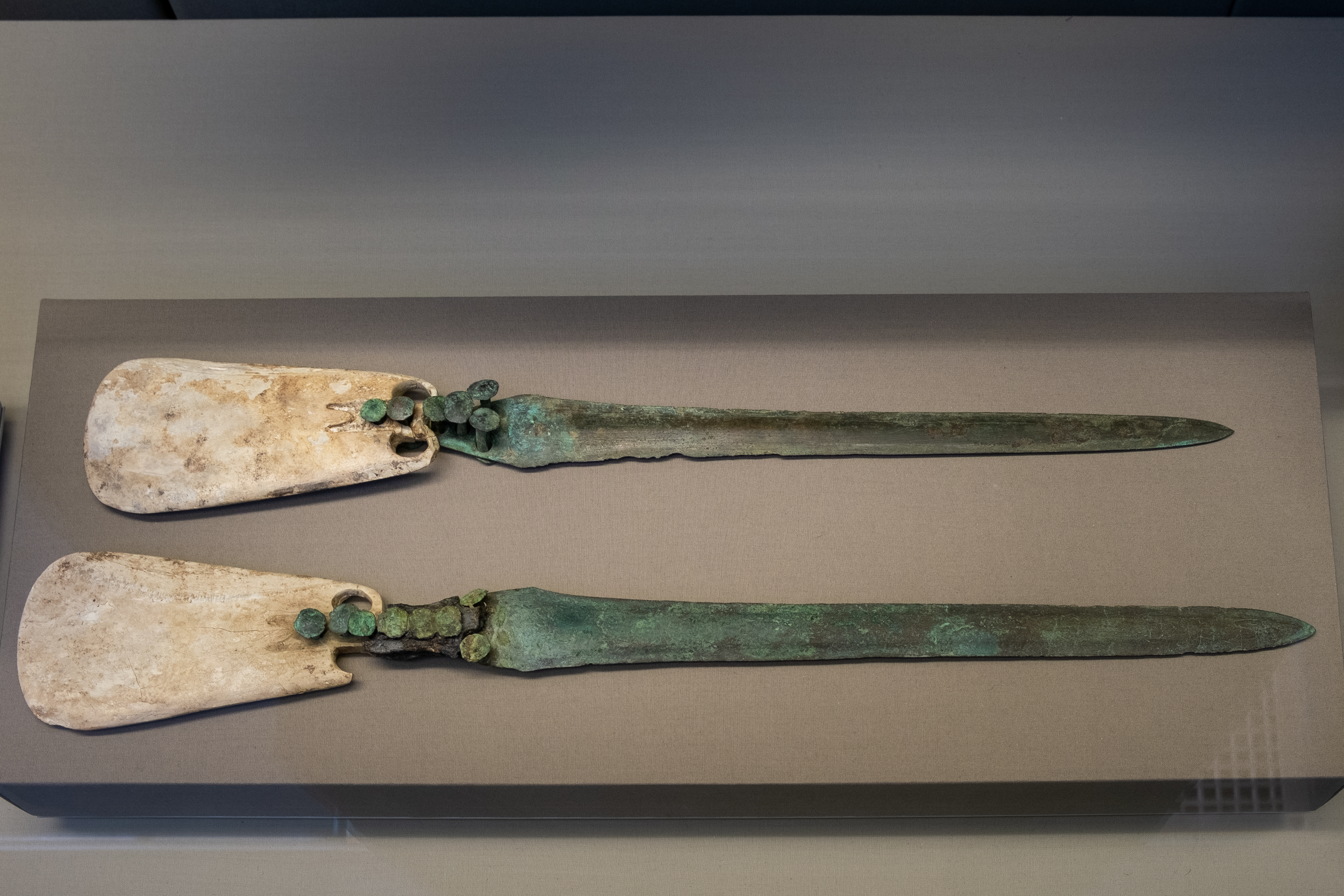
Daggers of bone and copper, 1750–1450 BC, Kerma, British Museum EA55442

Kerma grew from a fortified settlement of 3 ha (30,000 m^{2}) in the Middle Kerma period (2000–1750 BC), to a fully urban settlement of about 25 ha (250,000 m^{2}) in the Classic Kerma period (1750–1500 BC).

The Middle Kerma Period coincided with the Middle Kingdom of Egypt and the reigns of Egyptian pharaohs Amenemhat I to Sobekhotep IV (c. 1990–1725 BC). During this period Egypt conducted military campaigns into Lower Nubia, possibly to counter Kerman influence. The Twelfth Dynasty of Egypt Pharaoh Senwosret I established forts at Ikkur, Quban, Aniba, Buhen, and Kor. The fort at Qubban protected gold mining operations along Wadi Allaqi and Wadi Gabgaba. Kerma strongly fortified Saï, which served as the border to Upper Nubia.

The long history of Egyptian military activity in Lower Nubia may indicate that Kerma was perceived as a threat to Pharaonic Egypt at varying times. Principal Egyptian fortifications were built in the middle Nile Valley during the Middle Kingdom. These were to secure the Upper Egyptian border against raids from Kerma, and more than probably and to protect the valuable trade routes between the two regions. Both during the Middle and New Kingdoms, the resources Kerma possessed—gold, cattle, milk products, ebony, incense, ivory, etc.—were much coveted by Egypt. Its army was built around archers.

During the Middle and Classic periods Egyptian influence becomes increasingly visible in the development of linear-walled, fired mudbrick architecture, more elaborate burial practices, and imported prestige goods.

==== Classic Kerma ====
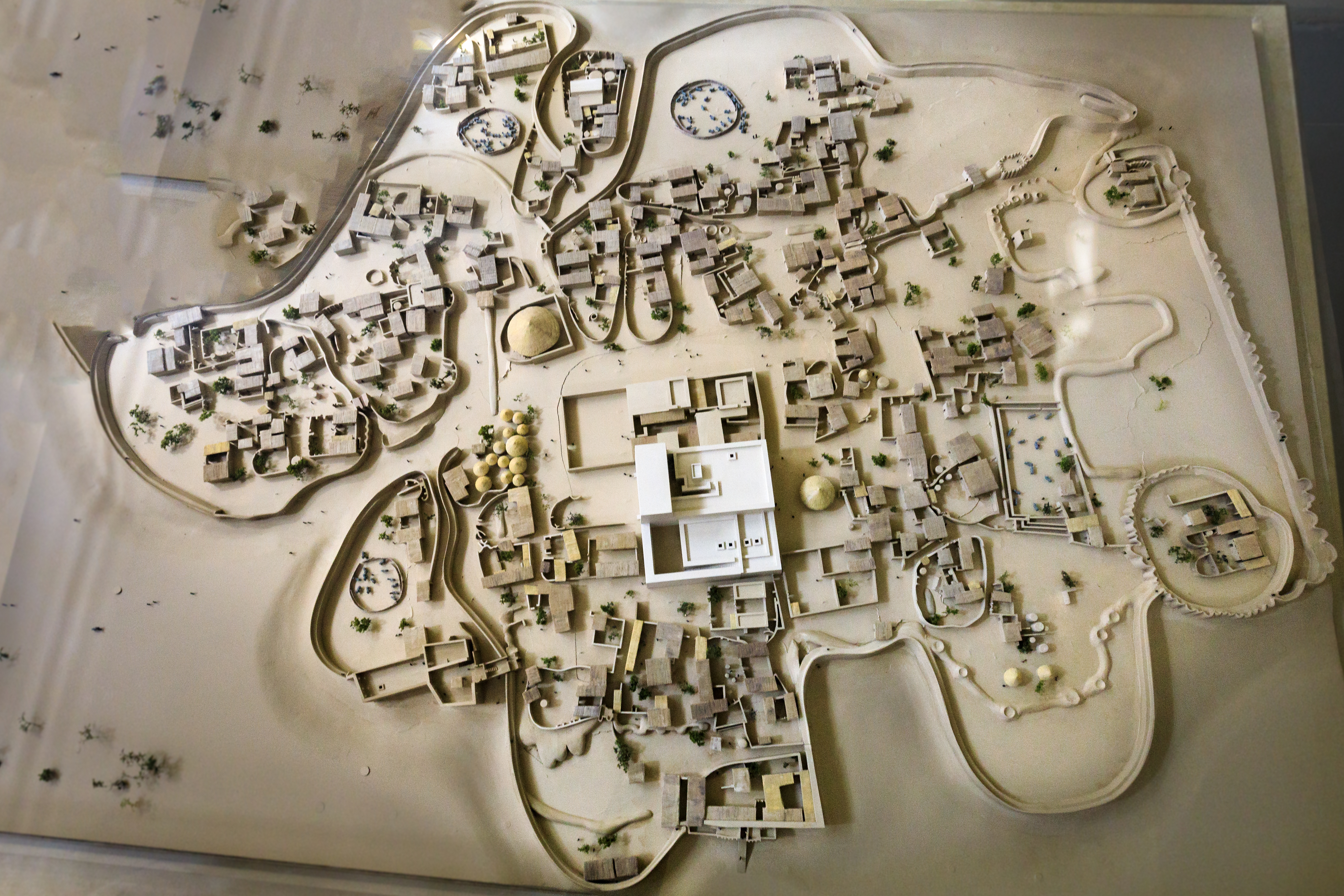
Model of the city of Kerma in the Classic Period, 1750-1500 BC

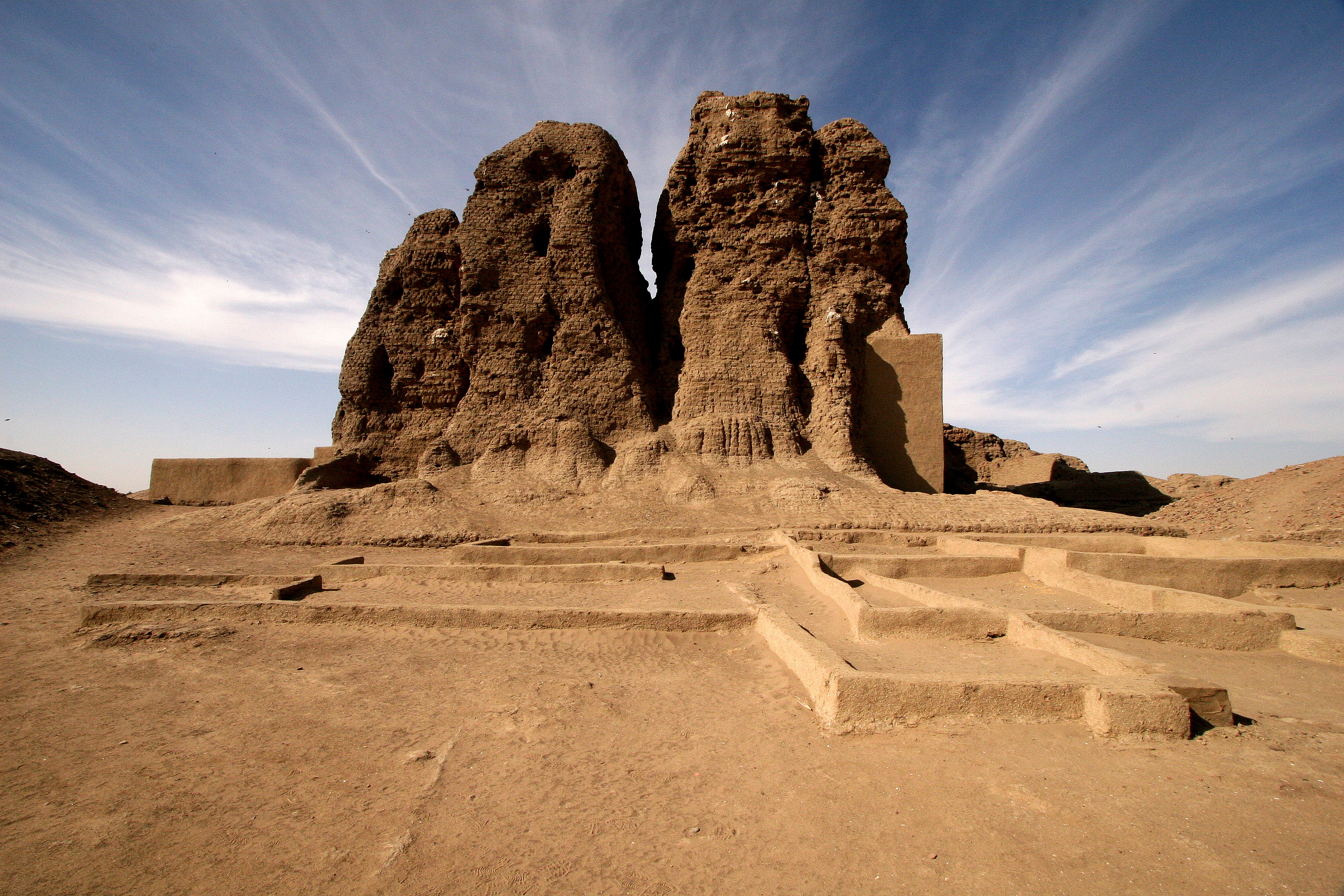
Remains of the Western Deffufa temple, built after c. 1750 BC during the Classic Kerma period

Egyptian control weakened during the 13th Dynasty and 2nd Intermediate Period. This became the period of greatest development of Kerma and its greatest extent — its Classic period, dating from c. 1750–1500 BC. During this period the city expanded, becoming a 'fully urban settlement' of about 25 hectares. Massive royal tombs were built in the city's necropolis, and included a large number of human sacrifices, and secondary burials. Two large tumuli included white quartzite cones. A large monumental mudbrick temple known as the "Western Deffufa" was built in the centre of the town. Kushite confrontations also occurred with Egypt in Lower Nubia.

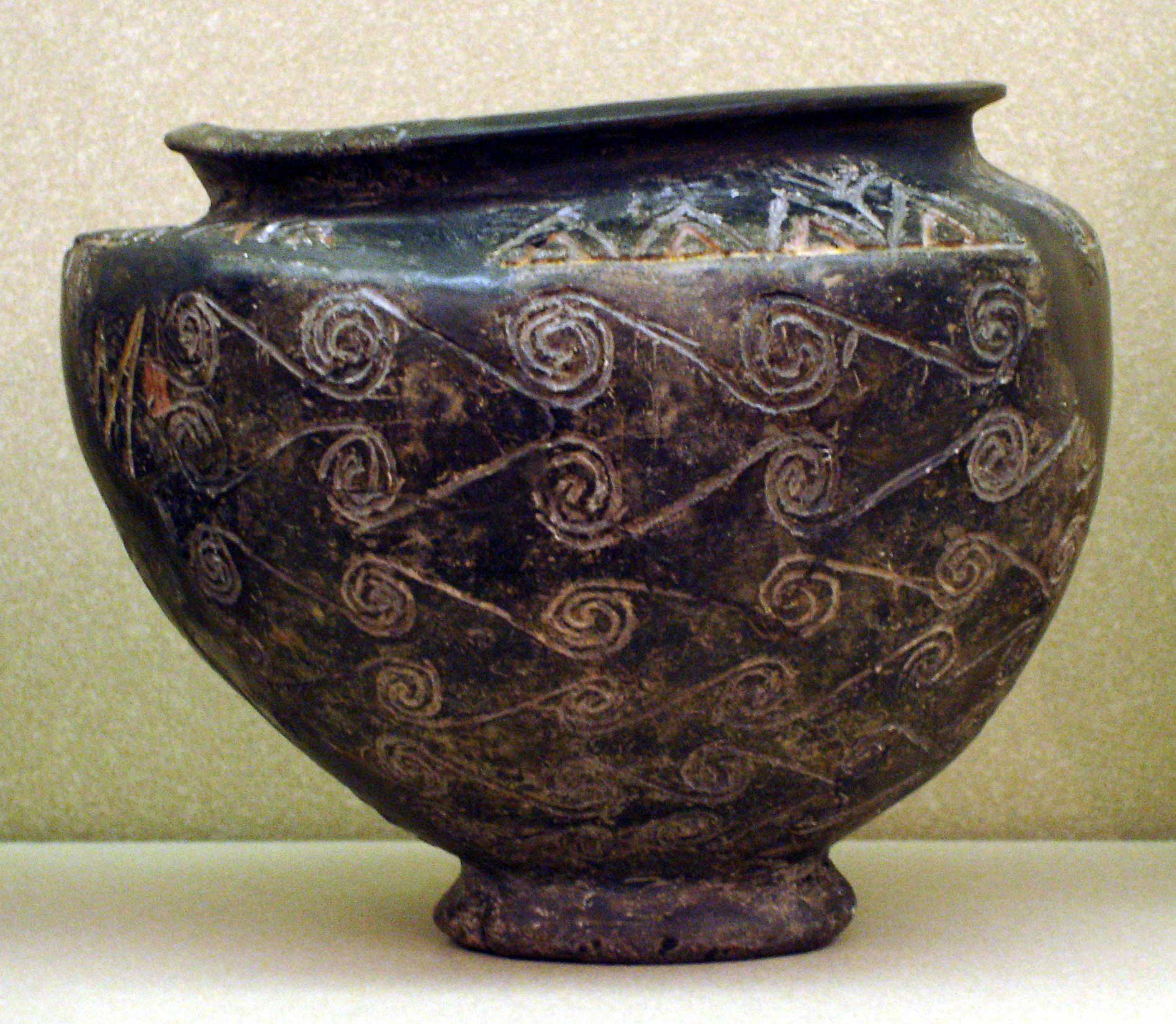
Ancient Kerma bowl kept at the Museum of Fine Arts, Boston. "Bowl with Running-Spiral Decoration". 1700–1550 BC (Classic Kerma Period)

During its zenith, Kerma formed a partnership with the Hyksos and tried to crush Egypt. An inscription in the tomb of the ancient Egyptian governor Sobeknakht II at Nekheb reports that Kerma invaded deep into Egypt between 1575 and 1550 BC. It is believed that this was one of Egypt's most humiliating defeats, which later pharaohs had erased from the official historic records. Many royal statues and monuments were looted from Egypt and removed to Kerma, apparently as a gesture of triumph by Kerma's ruler.

=== Late Kerma and Egyptian conquest ===
Under Thutmose I of the New Kingdom, Egypt made several campaigns south, destroying Kerma. This eventually resulted in the Egyptian annexation of Nubia (Kerma/ Kush) c. 1504 BC, and the establishment of a southern frontier at Kanisah Kurgus, south of the Fourth Cataract. After the conquest, Kerma culture was increasingly 'Egyptianized' yet rebellions continued for 220 years (till c. 1300 BC). During the New Kingdom, Kerma/Kush nevertheless became a key province of the Egyptian Empire—economically, politically and spiritually. Indeed, major Pharonic ceremonies were held at Jebel Barkal near Napata, which included a large Amun temple.

The New Kingdom of Egypt maintained control of Lower and Middle Nubia, with a Viceroy of Kush, or 'King's Son of Kush'. Egyptian settlements were established on Sai Island, Sedeinga, Soleb, Mirgissa, and Sesibi. Qubban continued to play a strategic role in Eastern Desert gold mining operations.

The extent of cultural/political continuity between the Kingdom of Kerma and the chronologically succeeding Kingdom of Kush is difficult to determine. The latter polity began to emerge around 1000 BC, around 500 years after the end of the Kingdom of Kerma. Initially, the Kushite kings continued to use Kerma for royal burials and special ceremonies, suggesting some connection. Moreover, the layout of royal funerary compounds in both Kerma and Napata (the Kush capital) are similarly designed. Caches of statues of Kush's pharaohs have also been discovered at Kerma, suggesting that the Napatan rulers recognized a historic link between their capital and Kerma.

== Ecopolitical structure ==
Until recently, the Kerma civilisation was known only from the townsite and cemeteries of its metropolitan centre and smaller sites in Kerma, Sudan. However, recent survey and excavation work has identified many new sites south of Kerma, many located on channels of the Nile, now dry, which lay to the east of the modern course of the river. This pattern of settlement indicates a substantial population and for the first time provides a political context for metropolitan Kerma. Survey work in advance of the Merowe Dam at the Fourth Cataract has confirmed the presence of Kerma sites at least as far upriver as the Abu Hamad/Mograt Island area.

Kerma was evidently a sizable political entity—Egyptian records speak of its rich and populous agricultural regions. Unlike Egypt, Kerma seems to have been highly centralized. It controlled the 1st to 4th Cataracts, which meant its domain was as extensive as ancient Egypt.

Numerous village communities scattered alongside fields of crops made up the bulk of the realm, but there also seems to have been districts where pastoralism (goat, sheep and cattle) and gold processing were important industries. Certain Kerma towns served to centralize agricultural products and direct trade. Analysis of the skulls of thousands of cattle interred in royal Kerma tombs suggest that stock were sometimes brought vast distances, from far districts, presumably as a type of tribute from rural communities on the death of Kerma's monarchs. This parallels the importance of cattle as royal property in other parts of Africa at later times.

Evidence for settled agriculture in the region dates from the pre-Kerma period, c. 3500–2500 BC, whilst copper metallurgy is attested at Kerma from c. 2200–2000 BC.

Only the centres of Kerma (including Doukki Gel) and Sai Island seem to have had contained sizable urban populations. Possibly further excavations will reveal other regional centres. At Kerma and Sai, there is much evidence of wealthy elites, and a class of dignitaries who monitored trade in merchandise arriving from far-off lands, and who supervised shipments dispatched from administrative buildings. Evidently, Kerma played an important intermediary role in the trade of luxury items from the Central African interior to Egypt.

== Religious and spiritual tradition ==
The religious tradition of the Kerma culture was markedly distinct from later Napatan and Meroitic traditions, likely as a result of the Egyptianization that occurred during the New kingdom where polytheism was introduced into Upper Nubia. During the Classical Kerma period animals were represented in their full form, without anthropomorphic characterisations more associated with Egyptian polytheistic tradition, Four animals held supreme importance: rams, lions, winged hippopotami, and winged giraffes. Some scholars believe the Kermans had an animistic view as evidenced by them treating Jebel Barkal as a sacred site, a tradition that would be passed on to New Kingdom Egyptians. Indigenous Upper Nubian deities such as Apedamak evolved out of the Kerma culture where there was reverence for non-anthropomorphic lions and animals during the Classical Kerma period, which were later deified in a polytheistic anthropomorphic fashion during the Meroitic period. Amulets were also common and certain amulets seemed to depict mythical creatures. The likely animistic nature of the Kerma culture shows similarities to other traditional African religions.

== Language ==
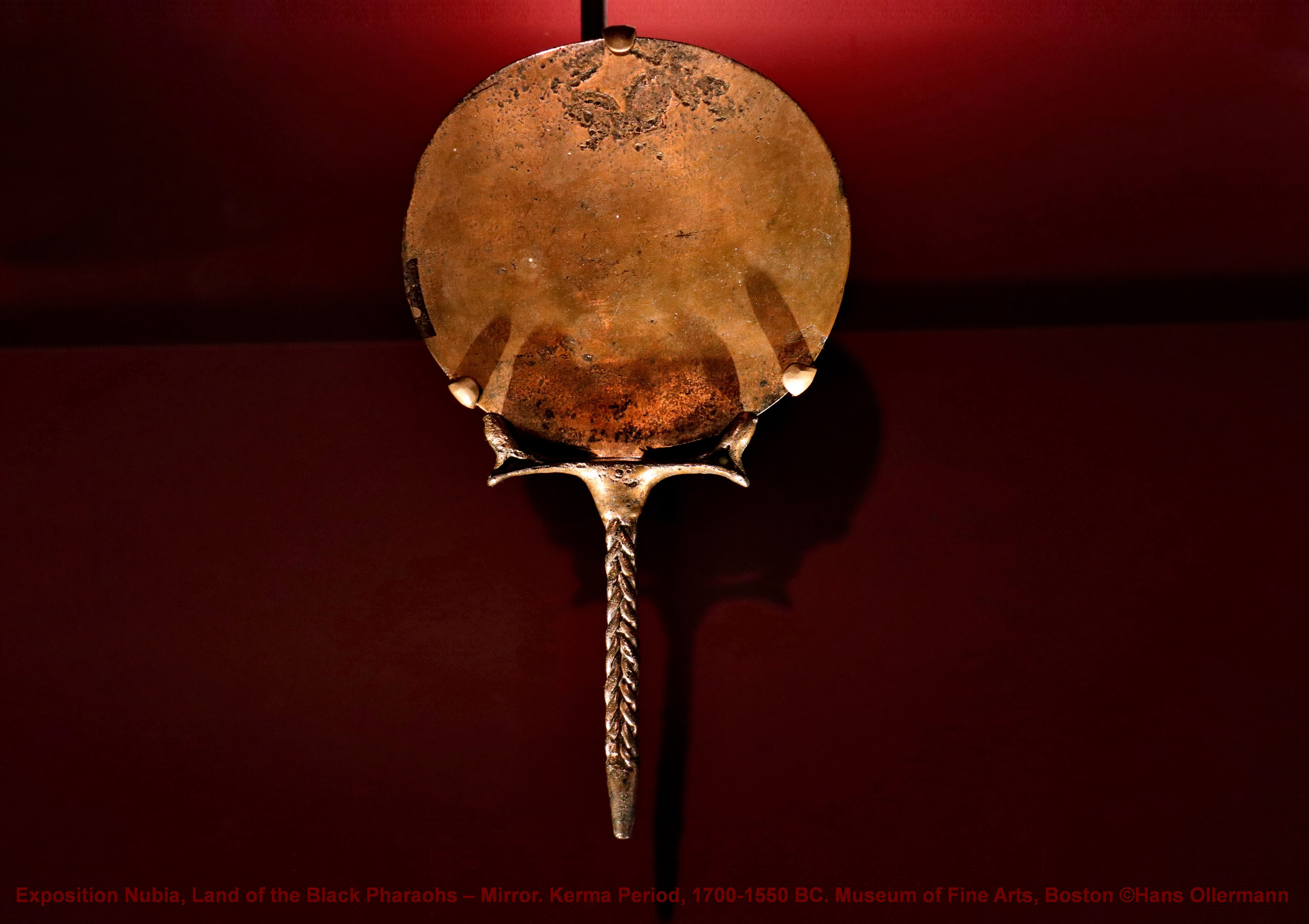
Mirror. Classic Kerma Period, 1700–1550 BC

The linguistic affiliation of the Kerma culture is currently unknown, and membership to both the Nilo-Saharan and Afro-Asiatic language families has been proposed.

According to Peter Behrens (1981) and Marianne Bechaus-Gerst (2000), linguistic evidence indicates that the Kerma peoples spoke Afroasiatic languages of the Cushitic branch. They propose that the Nilo-Saharan Nobiin language today contains a number of key pastoralism related loanwords that are of proto-Highland East Cushitic origin, including the terms for sheep/goatskin, hen/cock, livestock enclosure, butter and milk. They argue that this in turn suggests that the Kerma population—which, along with the C-Group Culture, inhabited the Nile Valley immediately before the arrival of the first Nubian speakers—spoke Afroasiatic languages.

Claude Rilly (2010, 2016) on the other hand, suggests that the Kerma peoples spoke Nilo-Saharan languages of the Eastern Sudanic branch, possibly ancestral to the later Meroitic language, which he also suggests was Nilo-Saharan. Rilly also criticizes proposals (by Behrens and Bechaus-Gerst) of significant early Afro-Asiatic influence on Nobiin, and considers evidence of substratal influence on Nobiin from an earlier now extinct Eastern Sudanic language to be stronger.

Julien Cooper (2017) also suggests that Nilo-Saharan languages of the Eastern Sudanic branch were spoken by the people of Kerma, as well as those further south along the Nile, to the west, and those of Saï (an island to the north of Kerma), but that Afro-Asiatic (most probably Cushitic) languages were spoken by other peoples in Lower Nubia (such as the Medjay and the C-Group culture) living in Nubian regions north of Saï toward Egypt and those southeast of the Nile in Punt in the Eastern dessert. Based partly on an analysis of the phonology of place names and personal names from the relevant regions preserved in ancient texts, he argues that the terms from "Kush" and "Irem" (ancient names for Kerma and the region south of it respectively) in Egyptian texts display traits typical of Eastern Sudanic languages, while those from further north (in Lower Nubia) and east are more typical of the Afro-Asiatic family, noting: "The Irem-list also provides a similar inventory to Kush, placing this firmly in an Eastern Sudanic zone. These Irem/Kush-lists are distinctive from the Wawat-, Medjay-, Punt-, and Wetenet-lists, which provide sounds typical to Afroasiatic languages."

Cooper (2017, 2020) suggests that an Eastern Sudanic language (perhaps early Meroitic) was spoken at Kerma by at least 1800 BC (the time from which toponymic evidence is available), whose arrival, and that of a new ethno-linguistic group, around that time may perhaps be indicated by a change in placenames for Upper Nubia used in Egyptian execration texts. However, Cooper also proposes that a similar Eastern Sudanic language may have been already spoken in Upper Nubia, both at Kerma and the Saï polity to its north, earlier (by Kerma Moyen, which began around 2050 BC), while north of Saï, in Lower Nubia, Cushitic languages were spoken and much later replaced by Meroitic. It is posited that early Meroitic spread, displacing Eastern Sudanic and Cushitic languages along the Nile.

== History of archaeological research ==
=== 20th century archaeology ===
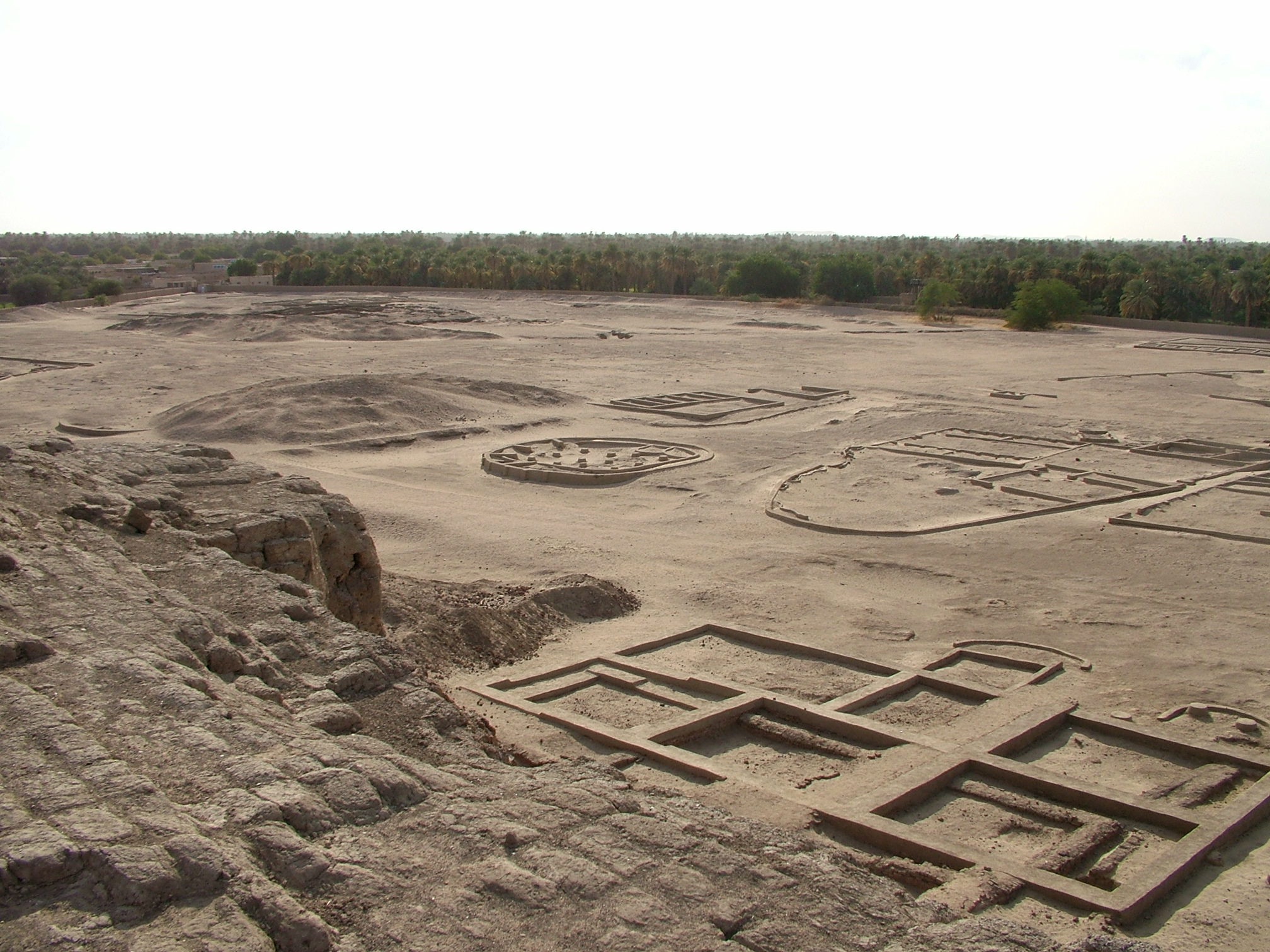
Excavations at Kerma

When Kerma was first excavated in the 1920s, George Andrew Reisner believed that it originally served as the base for or was a fort of an Egyptian governor, and that these Egyptian rulers evolved into the independent monarchs of Kerma. Reisner's interpretation was predicated on the presence of inscribed Egyptian statues in the large burials, which he thought belonged to those named individuals. Thus, scholars accepted the view that Kerma was a trading outpost of the Egyptians, being too small and far away from the known borders of ancient Egypt to be more directly linked to it.

It was only starting in mid-20th century that excavations began to reveal that Kerma city was much larger and more complex than previously assumed. It was also realized that the material culture and burial practices here are overwhelmingly of local Kerman origin rather than Egyptian.

Swiss archaeologist Charles Bonnet was among the first scholars to challenge Reisner's views and, according to him, it took 20 years for Egyptologists to accept his arguments.

=== 21st century archaeology and biological anthropology ===
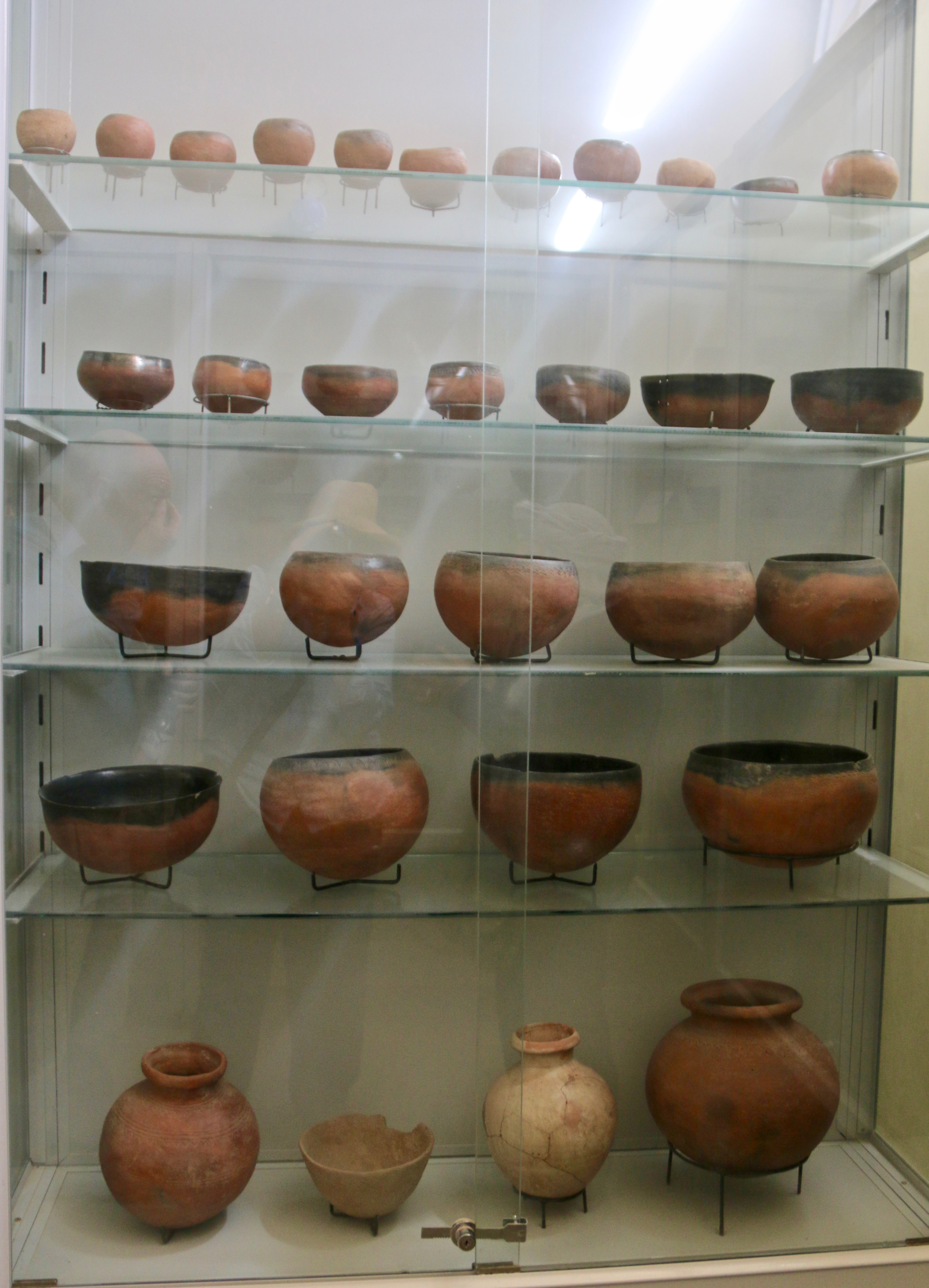
Pottery, Kerma Museum, Kerma, Sudan

In 2003, archaeologist Charles Bonnet heading a team of Swiss archaeologists excavating near Kerma discovered a cache of monumental black granite statues of the Pharaohs of the Twenty-fifth Dynasty of Egypt now exposed in the Kerma Museum. Among the sculptures were ones belonging to the dynasty's last two pharaohs, Taharqa and Tanoutamon, whose statues are described as "masterpieces that rank among the greatest in art history".

Craniometric analysis of Kerma fossils comparing them to various other early populations inhabiting the Nile Valley and Maghreb found that they were morphologically close to Predynastic Egyptians from Naqada (4000–3200 BC). The Kermans were also more distantly related to Dynastic Egyptians from Gizeh (323 BC – AD 330) and Predynastic Egyptian samples from Badari (4400–4000 BC), followed by the ancient Garamantes of Libya (900 BC – AD 500), who were found to be most closely related to Neolithic sub-Saharan African samples, and Roman period Egyptians, and secondary to modern Tunisians and Moroccans as well as early osteological series from Algeria (1500 BC), Carthage in Tunisia (751 BC – AD 435), Soleb in Nubia (1575–1380 BC), and Ptolemaic dynasty-era samples from Alexandria in Egypt (323 BC – AD 30).

Dental trait analysis of Kerma fossils found affinities with various populations inhabiting the Nile Valley, Horn of Africa, and Northeast Africa, especially to other ancient populations from the central and northern Sudan. Among the sampled populations, the Kerma people were overall nearest to the Kush populations in Upper Nubia, the A-Group culture bearers of Lower Nubia, and to Ethiopians, followed by the Meroitic, X-Group and Christian period inhabitants of Lower Nubia, and then to the C-Group and Pharaonic era skeletons excavated in Lower Nubia and ancient Egyptians (Naqada, Badari, Hierakonpolis, Abydos and Kharga in Upper Egypt; Hawara in Lower Egypt).

Kerma culture and contemporary cultures c. 2000 BC

Claude Rilly, citing anthropologist Christian Simon, reports that the population of the Kingdom of Kerma was morphologically heterogeneous, with three main clusters in terms of morphological tendencies (A, B, C): "Cluster A is similar to a sample of modern Kenyan skeletons. Cluster C is similar to a sample of Middle Empire skeletons from the region of Assuan, and Cluster B, which although distinct from Cluster C, shares many common features with it. He notes that clusters A and B were present in Early Kerma in ("Kerma ancien") but became the majority in the following Middle Kerma ("Kerma moyen"), and that Cluster C was mainly present in early Kerma and "possibly represents the descendency of the Pre-Kerma population that founded Kerma 4 km away from the original settlement, when the Nile riverbed shrunk...." Rilly continues: "However, the fact that their cemetery remained on the ancestral site might indicate cultural and ethnical continuity between Pre-Kerma and the new city. Cluster A and B were already present in Kerma ancien, but become majoritary in the following stage."

In 2003, Japanese anthropologists Tsunehiko Hanihara, Hajime Ishida and Yukio Dodoet examined cranial traits from 70 human populations. The survey featured sourced samples from Predynastic Naqada and 12th-13th dynasty Kushite Kerma (Sudan). In the context of the study, these samples were collectively classified as "North Africans" and other samples from Nigeria were classified as "Sub-Saharans", but lacked a specified dating period. Overall, the samples from predynastic Naqada and Kerma clustered most closely and more remotely with European groups, whilst the other samples from Sub-Saharan Africa showed "significant separation from other regions, as well as diversity among themselves". "Craniometry,is a fully discredited "junk science" used to justify racism and colonialism. Modern science has proven that cranial variations relate to geography and environment, not an innate racial hierarchy. The field was debunked by findings that skull shape is plastic, and that there is more variation within racial groups than between them". Dna testing of hair samples show Genetic relation to Neolithic eastern African pastoralists " />

S.O.Y. Keita, conducted an anthropological study which examined the crania of groups in the North African region which included samples from Kerma, circa 2000 BC, the Maghreb region, circa 1500 BC, and 1st dynasty crania from the royal tombs in Abydos, Egypt. The results of the study determined the predominant pattern of the First Dynasty Egyptian crania was "Southern" or a "tropical African variant" (though others were also observed), which had affinities with Kerma Kushites. The general results demonstrate greater affinity with Upper Nile Valley groups, but also suggest clear change from earlier craniometric trends, with numerous 1st dynasty crania from Abydos classified into the "northern Egyptian-Maghreb" series. The gene flow and movement of northern officials to the important southern city may explain the findings.

== Genetics ==
A 2022 study by Ke Wang and colleagues analysed ancient genome-wide DNA retrieved from the naturally mummified hair of an individual belonging to a rural agro-pastoral population linked with the Kerma culture, dating from circa 2000 BC. This individual, from Kadruka in Upper Nubia, was found to be genetically indistinguishable from contemporary Pastoral Neolithic individuals in eastern Africa (in modern-day Kenya and Tanzania), who themselves carried a mix of ancestries consisting of approximately 60% East African-related ancestry (modelled as a mix of Dinka and Mota ancestries) and 40% ancestry related to "sampled present-day groups from northern Africa and the Levant" (modelled as Chalcolithic Israel ancestry). The Kadruka individual showed a similar mix of ancestries. The close relatedness of the Kadruka individual to early pastoral populations in eastern Africa is consistent with evidence for the dispersal of herding populations southwards along the Nile River Valley, with the Kadruka individual representing a possible genetic source population for early eastern African pastoralists.

== See also ==
- Doukki Gel
- List of monarchs of Kerma
- Gash Group
- Western Deffufa
