= Egyptian Invasion of Kerma =

Egyptian invasion of Kerma (Sudan) in 1504 BC

The Ancient Egyptian invasion of Kerma
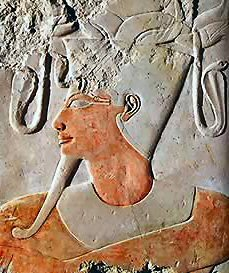
Date	1506 BC
Location	Kerma
Result	Egyptian Victory

Belligerents
New Kingdom of Egypt	Kerma

Commanders and leaders
Thutmose I Sobeknakht II	

Between 1575 and 1550 BC, the Kerma Kingdom posed a major threat to Ancient Egypt. According to inscriptions from tomb of Egyptian governor Sobeknakht II at Nekheb, Kerma forces invaded deep into Egyptian territory during this period. In 1504 BC, Thutmose I saw the need to counter this growing danger and obtain Nubia’s rich resources, especially gold.

== Ancient Egyptian advance to the south ==
Thutmose I led his army south to a rocky mountain named Jebel Barkal. This location was very important both militarily and religiously; it was thought by the priests of the Temple of Amun to be the birthplace of the god Amun. This would further justify the invasion, linking religious motives with military goals. Jebel Barkal was rich in gold and other valuable resources, making seizing it important for Egypt's wealth and power.

== Reasons for the invasion ==
When Egypt was experiencing internal turmoil and wars during the reign of the Hyksos in Lower Egypt, the Kerma Kingdom took advantage and expanded into Egyptian territory, even invading as far as Thebes, which was one of Egypt's most important cities. After Ahmose I defeated the Hyksos in the northeastern Nile Delta, he launched military campaigns against Kerma, leading to several confrontations that eventually ended in Nubia falling under Egyptian control. During the reign of Amenhotep I, military effort continued beyond Egypt's borders, deep into Nubia expanding Egyptian control as far south as the Third cataract of the Nile. Later, Thutmose I further extended Ancient Egyptian influence into Nubia, asserting control over the whole of the Kerma Kingdom. His military campaigns helped solidify Ancient Egyptian dominance, some records show that he went as far as Kanisah Kurgus beyond the Fourth Cataract.
