= List of monarchs of Kerma =

The following is an incomplete list of monarchs of Kerma. The Kingdom of Kerma existed as an independent state from around 2500 BCE to 1500 BCE. It was absorbed into the vigorous Egyptian Empire but would later reemerge as the Kingdom of Kush.

== Rulers of Kerma ==
- Kaa (kꜣꜣ) (c. 1900 BCE)
- Teriahi (tr(ỉ)ꜣhỉ) (c. 1880 BCE) - son of Kaa
- Awawa (ꜣwꜣw/ꜣwꜣꜣ) (c. 1870 BCE) - son of Kaa
- [Uterer]ses (wttrrss) (c. 1850 BCE) - son of Awawa

== Sources ==
- Hamblin, William J. (2006). Warfare in the Ancient Near East to 1600 BC. Routledge. ISBN 978-1-134-52062-6.
- Török, László (1998). The Kingdom of Kush: Handbook of the Napatan-Meroitic Civilization. Leiden: BRILL. pp. 589 Pages. ISBN 90-04-10448-8.
- Shillington, Kevin (2004). Encyclopedia of African History, Vol. 1. London: Routledge. pp. 1912 Pages. ISBN 1-57958-245-1.
