= Upper Nubia =

Southernmost part of Nubia

Upper Nubia (also called Kush) is the southernmost part of Nubia, upstream on the Nile from Lower Nubia. It is so called because the Nile flows north, so it is further upstream and of higher elevation in relation to Lower Nubia.

The extension of Upper Nubia is rather ill-defined and depends on the researchers' approach.

== Geographical approach ==
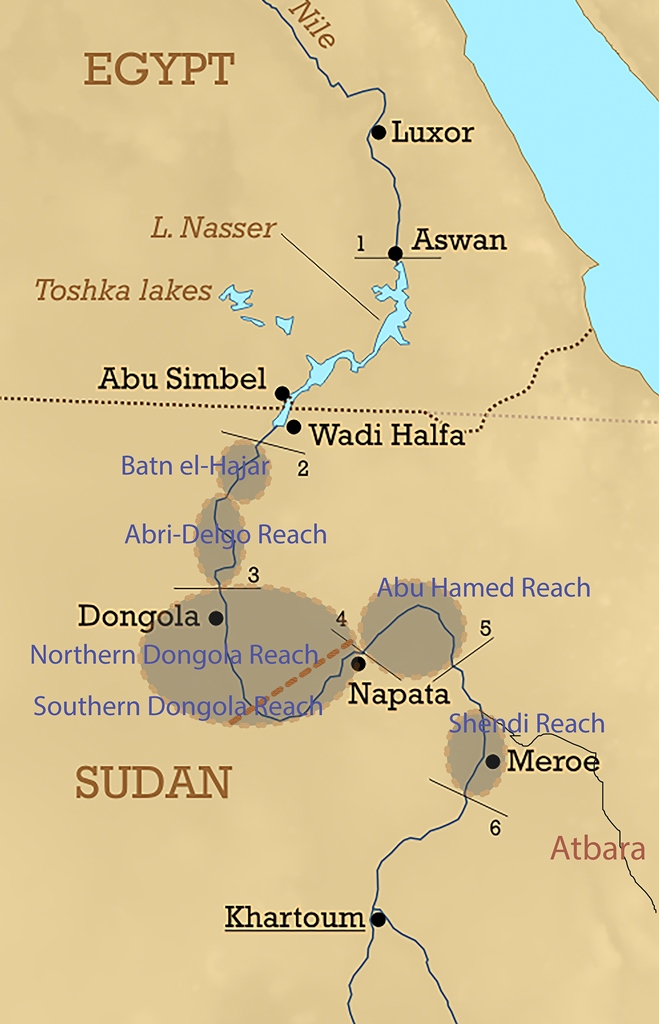
Physiographic zones of Upper Nubia corresponding to distinct reaches of the Nile

Geographically speaking Upper Nubia designs the area between the Second and the Sixth cataracts of the Nile. Occasionally the term Middle Nubia is used to design the area between the Second and the Third cataract; in this case Upper Nubia begins at the Third cataract going upstream.

Physiographic subdivisions of Upper Nubia alongside the Nile cataracts:
Area	From	To
Batn-El-Hajar	Second cataract	Dal cataract
Abri-Delgo Reach	Dal cataract	Third cataract
Dongola Reach	Third cataract	Fourth cataract
Abu Hamed Reach	Fourth cataract	Fifth cataract
To be defined	Fifth cataract	Confluence of Atbara and Nile rivers
Shendi Reach	Confluence of Atbara River and Nile River	Sixth cataract

== Political approach ==
Politically speaking Upper Nubia falls in present northern and central Sudan stretching from the Egyptian border south to present-day Khartoum at the confluence of White Nile and Blue Nile.

== Historical approach ==
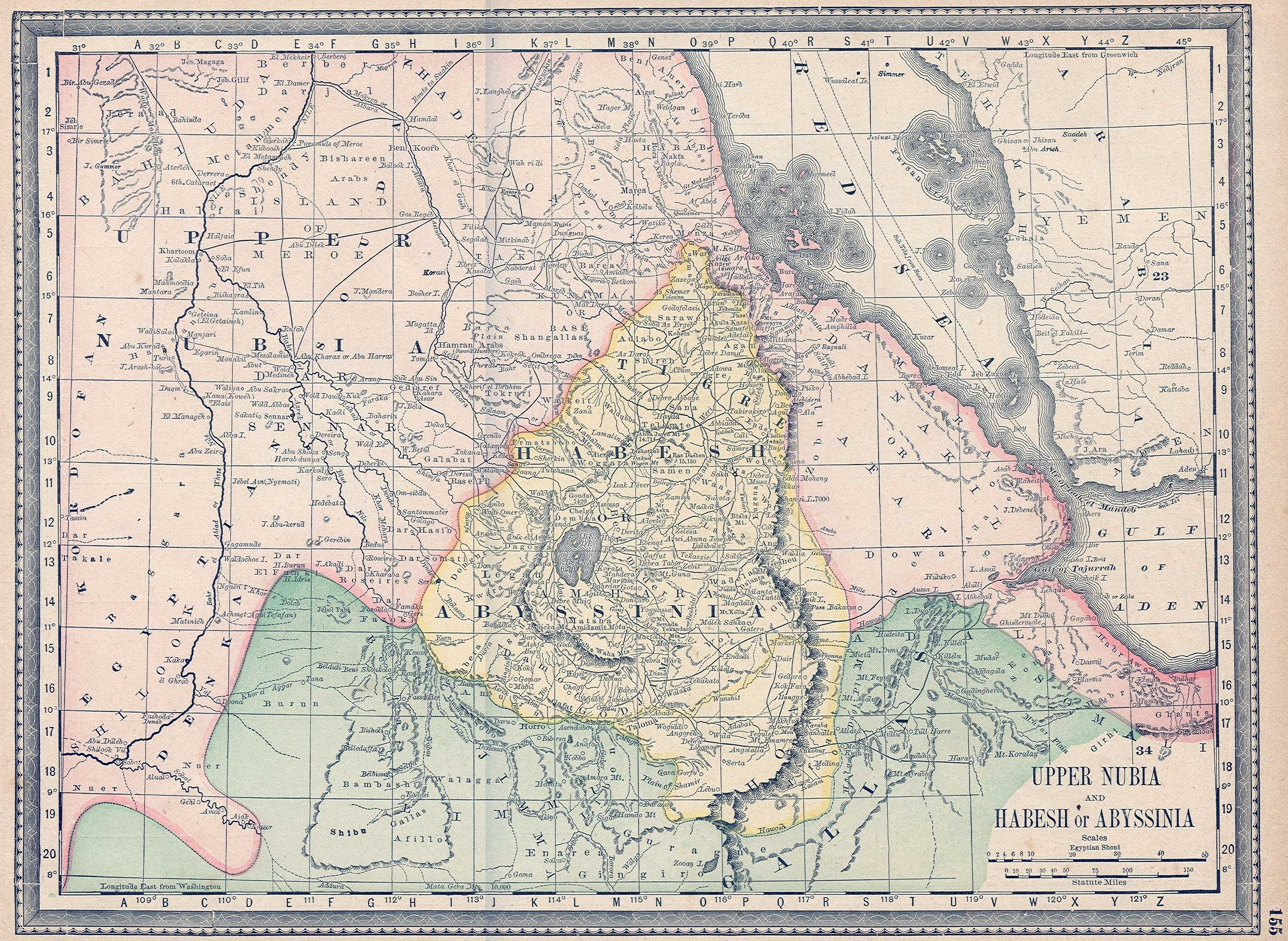
Upper Nubia and Abyssinia in 1891

Historically speaking Upper Nubia comprises the areas of influence of the Nubian part of New Kingdom Egypt or the kingdom of Kush or Meroe. Connecting the Mediterranean world with inner Africa, Upper Nubia was crisscrossed by important trade routes and has been the cradle of diverse cultures.

Civilization	Endurance from	Endurance to
Kerma culture	2500 BCE	1500 BCE
New Kingdom of Egypt	1550 BCE	1080 BCE
Kingdom of Kush	c. 800 BCE	4th century CE
Christian Nubia (Makuria and Alodia)	6th century AD	c. 1500
Funj Sultanate	1504	1821
