= Lower Nubia =

Northernmost part of Nubia

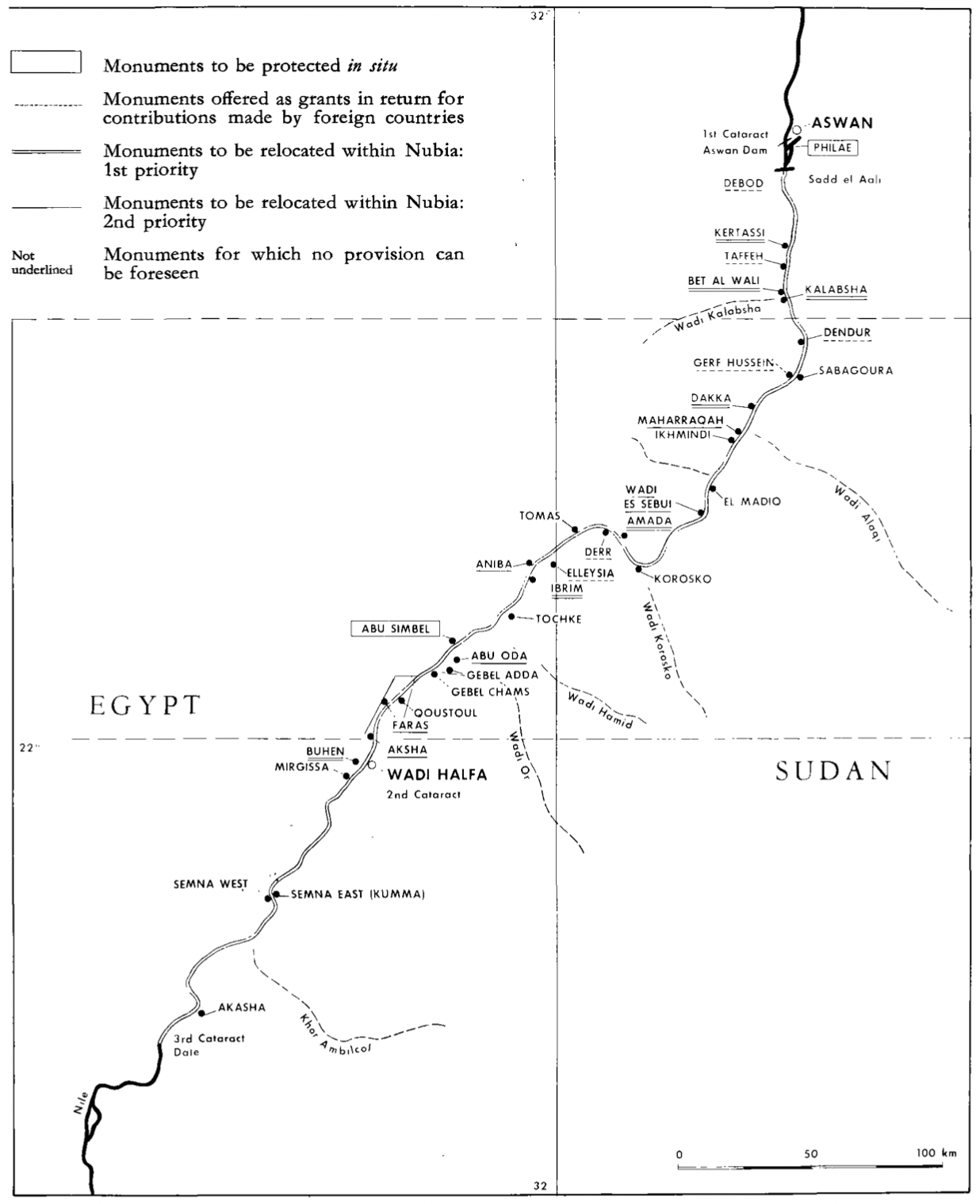
Lower Nubia shown as a list of monuments at risk in the 1960 UNESCO Courier

Lower Nubia (also called Wawat) is the northernmost part of Nubia, roughly contiguous with the modern Lake Nasser, which submerged the historical region in the 1960s with the construction of the Aswan High Dam. Many ancient Lower Nubian monuments, and all its modern population, were relocated as part of the International Campaign to Save the Monuments of Nubia; Qasr Ibrim is the only major archaeological site which was neither relocated nor submerged. The intensive archaeological work conducted prior to the flooding means that the history of the area is much better known than that of Upper Nubia. According to David Wengrow, the A-Group Nubian polity of the late 4th millennium BCE is poorly understood since most of the archaeological remains are submerged underneath Lake Nasser.

Its history is also known from its long relations with Egypt, particularly neighboring Upper Egypt. The region was historically defined as between the historical First and Second Cataracts, which are now both within Lake Nasser. The region was known to Greco-Roman geographers as Triakontaschoinos.

It is downstream on the Nile from Upper Nubia.

== History ==
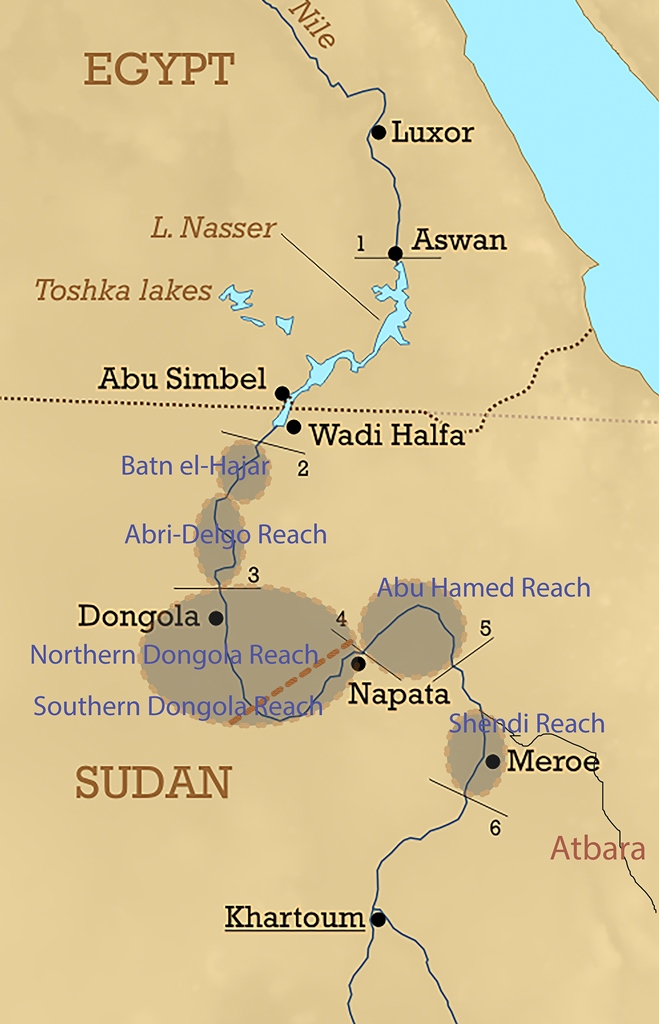
Lower Nubia lies mainly between the first and second cataracts with some historical overlappings.

During the Middle Kingdom, Lower Nubia was occupied by Egypt. when the Egyptians withdrew during the second Intermediate Period, Lower Nubia seems to have become part of the Upper Nubian Kingdom of Kerma. The New Kingdom occupied all of Nubia and Lower Nubia was especially closely integrated into Egypt, but with the Third Intermediate Period it became the centre of the independent state of Kush based at Napata at some point. Perhaps around 591 BC the capital of Kush was transferred south to Meroe and Lower Nubia became dominated by the Island of Meroe.

With the fall of the Meroitic Empire in the fourth century AD the area became home to X-Group, also known as the Ballana culture who were likely the Nobatae. This evolved into the Christian state of Nobatia by the fifth century. Nobatia was merged with the Upper Nubian state of Makuria, but Lower Nubia became steadily more Arabized and Islamicized and eventually became de facto independent as the state of al-Maris. Most of Lower Nubia was formally annexed by Egypt during the Ottoman conquest of 1517, and it has remained a part of Egypt since then, with only the south being Sudan.

== Language ==
Linguistic evidence indicates that Cushitic languages were spoken in Lower Nubia, an ancient region which straddles present day Southern Egypt and part of Northern Sudan, and that Nilo-Saharan languages were spoken in Upper Nubia to the south (by the peoples of the Kerma culture), with North Eastern Sudanic languages from Upper Nubia later replacing the Cushitic languages of Lower Nubia.

Julien Cooper (2017) states that in antiquity, Cushitic languages were spoken in Lower Nubia (the northernmost part of modern-day Sudan):

In antiquity, Afroasiatic languages in Sudan belonged chiefly to the phylum known as Cushitic, spoken on the eastern seaboard of Africa and from Sudan to Kenya, including the Ethiopian Highlands.

Julien Cooper (2017) also states that Eastern Sudanic speaking populations from southern and west Nubia gradually replaced the earlier Cushitic speaking populations of this region:

In Lower Nubia there was an Afroasiatic language, likely a branch of Cushitic. By the end of the first millennium CE this region had been encroached upon and replaced by Eastern Sudanic speakers arriving from the south and west, to be identified first with Meroitic and later migrations attributable to Nubian speakers.

In Handbook of Ancient Nubia, Claude Rilly (2019) states that Cushitic languages once dominated Lower Nubia along with the Ancient Egyptian language. Rilly (2019) states: "Two Afro-Asiatic languages were present in antiquity in Nubia, namely Ancient Egyptian and Cushitic."

Rilly (2019) mentions historical records of a powerful Cushitic speaking race which controlled Lower Nubia and some cities in Upper Egypt. Rilly (2019) states: "The Blemmyes are another Cushitic speaking tribe, or more likely a subdivision of the Medjay/Beja people, which is attested in Napatan and Egyptian texts from the 6th century BC on."

On page 134: "From the end of the 4th century until the 6th century AD, they held parts of Lower Nubia and some cities of Upper Egypt."

He mentions the linguistic relationship between the modern Beja language and the ancient Cushitic Blemmyan language which dominated Lower Nubia and that the Blemmyes can be regarded as a particular tribe of the Medjay:

The Blemmyan language is so close to modern Beja that it is probably nothing else than an early dialect of the same language. In this case, the Blemmyes can be regarded as a particular tribe of the Medjay.

In Upper Egypt and Northern Lower Nubia was present a series of cultures, the Badarian, Amratian, Gerzean, A-Group, B-Group, and C-Group. Linguistic evidence indicates that Cushitic languages were spoken in Lower Nubia, an ancient region which straddles present day Southern Egypt and Northern Sudan, before the arrival of North Eastern Sudanic languages in the Middle Nile Valley.

== Bibliography ==
- Roxana Flammini, "Ancient Core-Periphery Interactions: Lower Nubia During Middle Kingdom Egypt (ca. 2050–1640 B.C.)", in Journal of World Systems Research, Volume XIV, Number 1 (2008) PDF (discusses the Egyptian view of Nubia during the Middle and New Kingdoms).
