= Charles Bonnet (archeologist) =

Swiss archeologist

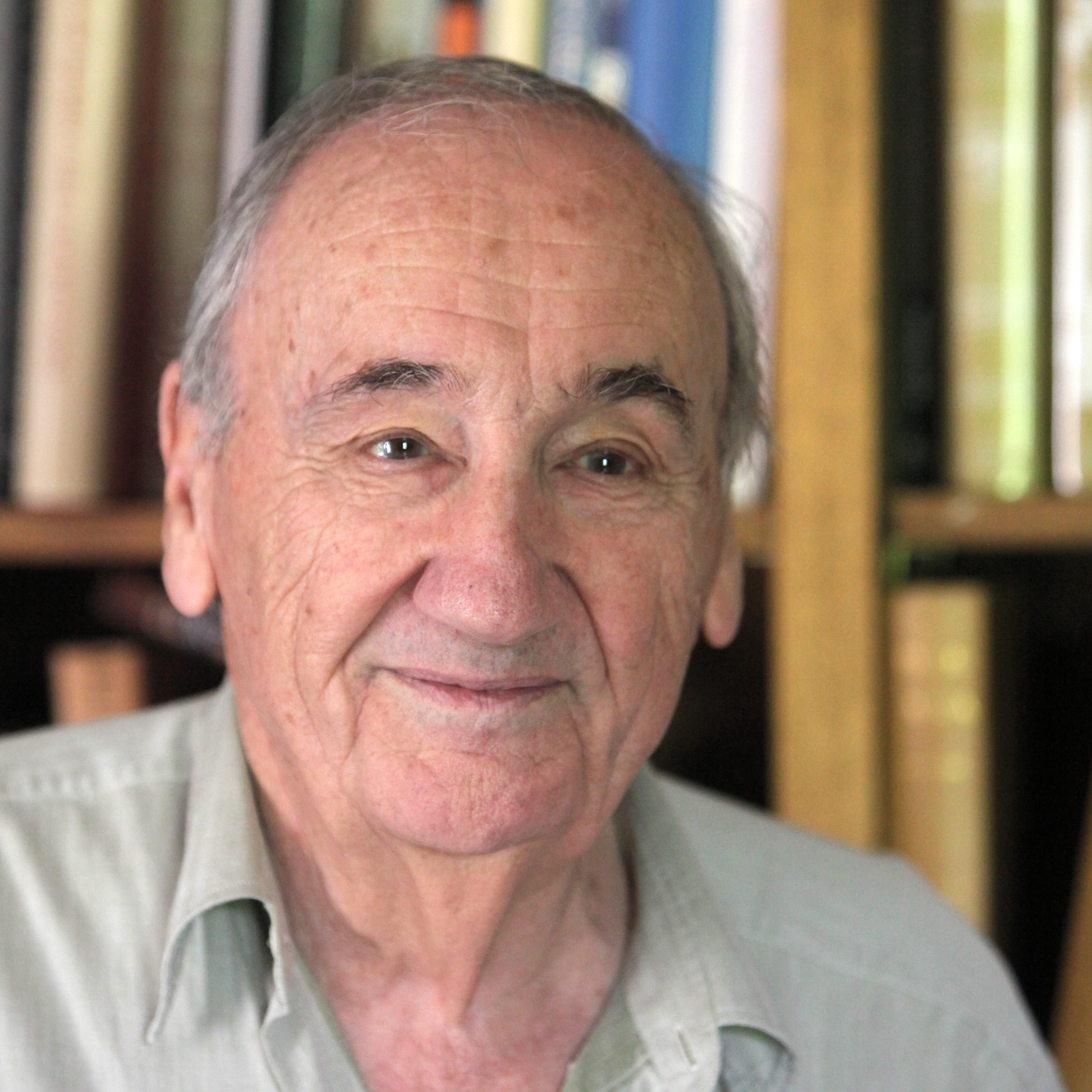
- Born: 15 March 1933 (age 93); Satigny, Switzerland

Academic background
- Education: University of Geneva; Lumière University Lyon 2

Academic work
- Discipline: archeology Egyptology
- Institutions: Collège de France
- Main interests: Ancient Nubia

Charles Bonnet (French pronunciation: [ʃaʁl bɔnɛ]; born 15 March 1933 in Satigny) is a Swiss archeologist, specialist of Ancient Nubia.

== Biography ==
Bonnet was born to a family of wine producers in 1933. After graduating with a diploma in Agriculture, he took over the family business in 1954. From 1961 to 1965, he studied Egyptology at the Oriental Studies centre (Note: Centre d'études orientales de l'université de Genève) of the University of Geneva.

He became an invited professor at Collège de France in 1985.

== Bibliography ==
- Bonnet, Charles; Valbelle, Dominique (3 September 2018). Les temples égyptiens de Panébès, Le jujubier, à Doukki Gel, Soudan. Paris: Éditions Khéops. ISBN 978-2916142128.
- Les premiers édifices chrétiens de la Madeleine à Genève, Société d'Histoire et d'Archéologie, Genève, 1977
- Kerma, Territoire et métropole, Le Caire, Institut français d'archéologie orientale, coll. « BiGen », 1986
- Kerma, royaume de Nubie (dir.), Genève, 1990
- Études nubiennes I-II (Actes du VII^{e} congrès des études nubiennes 3-8 septembre 1990), Genève, 1992
- avec Dominique Valbelle, Le sanctuaire d'Hathor, maîtresse de la turquoise, Sérabit el-Khadim au Moyen Empire, Paris, Picard, 1996
- avec Dominique Valbelle (éd.), Le Sinaï durant l'antiquité et le Moyen Âge, 4000 ans d'histoire pour un désert (Actes du colloque tenu à l'Unesco en septembre 1997), Paris, Errance, 1998
- Édifices et rites funéraires à Kerma, Errance, Paris, 2000
- Le temple principal de la ville de Kerma et son quartier religieux, Paris Errance, 2004
- avec Dominique Valbelle, Des pharaons venus d’Afrique, Citadelles et Mazenod, Paris, 2005 ; The Nubian Pharaohs, The American University in Cairo Press, 2005 ; Pharaonen aus dem schwarzen Afrika, Verlag Philipp von Zabern, 2006
- avec Alain Peillex, Les fouilles de la cathédrale Saint Pierre de Genève I, Le centre urbain de la protohistoire jusqu'au début de la christianisation ; II, Les édifices chrétiens et le groupe épiscopal, Société d'Histoire et d'Archéologie, Genève, 2009–2012
- La ville nubienne de Kerma, Lausanne, Éditions Favre, 2014

== Notes, citations and references ==
Notes

Citations

References

- Site de l'UMR 8167 Orient et Méditerranée, composante Mondes pharaoniques
