= Kerma =

Ancient Nubian capital city in Sudan

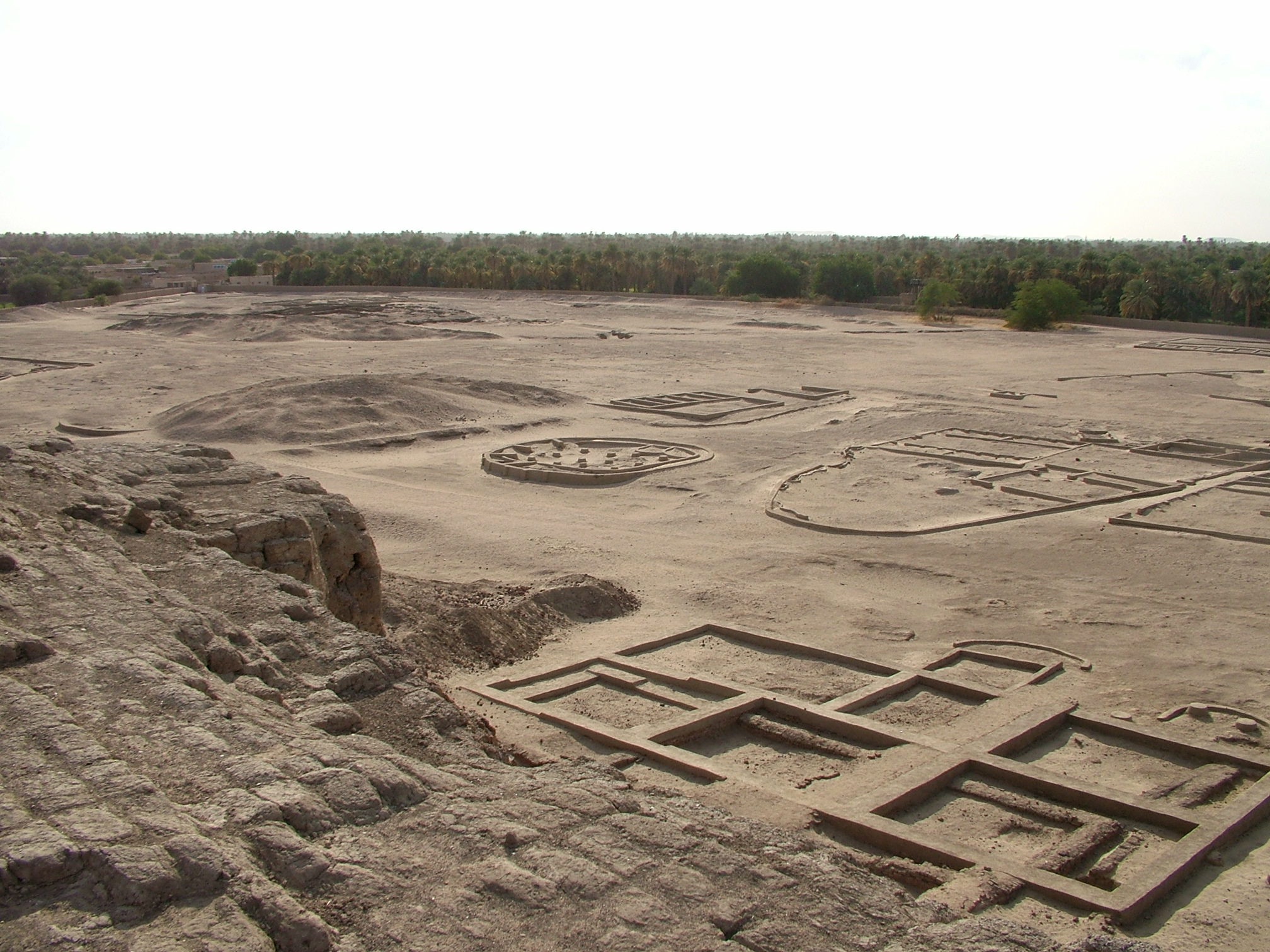
- Ancient city of Kerma

- Location within Sudan
- 19°36′2.89″N 30°24′35.03″E
- Type: Settlement
- Location: Northern State, Sudan
- Region: Nubia

Site notes
- Condition: In ruins

Kerma was the capital city of the Kingdom of Kerma, which had its roots in the pre-Kerma culture in present-day Sudan from 3500 BC. Kerma is one of the largest archaeological sites in ancient Nubia. It has produced decades of extensive excavations and research, including thousands of graves and tombs and the residential quarters of the main city surrounding the Western, or Lower, Deffufa.

The locale that is now Kerma was first settled by hunter-gatherers around 8350 BC, during the Mesolithic. Between 5550 BC and 5150 BC, the site was mostly abandoned, possibly due to decreased Nile flow during this time interval. A second hiatus in occupation occurred between 4050 BC and 3450 BC, likely as a result of minimal flow from the White Nile. Around 3000 BC, agriculture developed and a cultural tradition began around Kerma. Kerma later developed into a large urban center that was built around a large adobe temple known as the Western Deffufa, which was built after 1750 BC. A state society formed between 2550 BC and 1550 BC, with a significant decrease in cattle breeding being evidenced by the archaeological record around 1750 BC. Evidence for copper metallurgy appears from c. 2200–2000 BC. As a capital city and location of royal burials, Kerma sheds light on the complex social structure present in this society.

== Settlement periods ==
- Pre-Kerma (c. 3500–2500 BC) No C-Group culture Phase
- Early Kerma (c. 2500–2050 BC) C-Group Phase Ia–Ib
- Middle Kerma (c. 2050–1750 BC) C-Group Phase Ib–IIa
- Classic Kerma (c. 1750–1580 BC) C-Group Phase IIb–III
- Final Kerma (c. 1580–1500 BC) C-Group Phase IIb–III
- Late Kerma – "New Kingdom" (c. 1500–1100? BC) "New Kingdom"

== Kerma and its artifacts ==
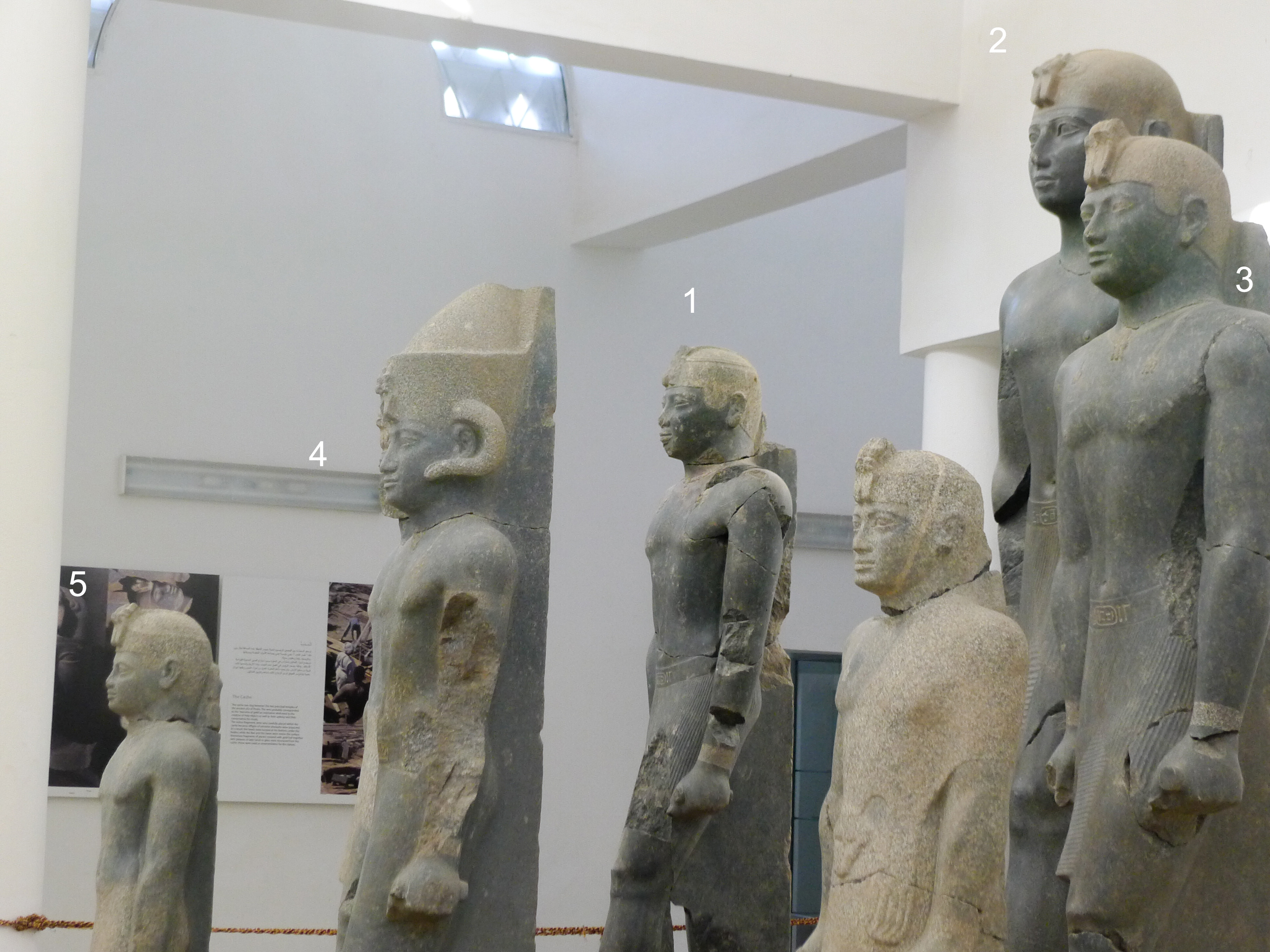
Statues of pharaohs of the Nubian Twenty-fifth Dynasty of Egypt discovered near Kerma, displayed in the Kerma Museum

By 1700 BC, Kerma was host to a population of at least 10,000 people. Different to those of ancient Egypt in theme and composition, Kerma's artefacts are characterized by extensive amounts of blue faience, which the Kermans developed techniques to work with independently of Egypt, and by their work with glazed quartzite and architectural inlays.

=== Kerma's cemetery and royal tombs ===
Kerma contains a cemetery with over 30,000 graves. The cemetery shows a general pattern of larger graves ringed by smaller ones, suggesting social stratification. The site includes at its southern boundary burial mounds, with four extending upwards of 90 metres (300 feet) in diameter. These are believed to be the graves of the city's final kings, some of which contain motifs and artwork reflecting Egyptian deities such as Horus. Generally, influence from Egypt may be observed in numerous burials, especially with regards to material evidence such as pottery and grave goods. For example, Second Intermediate Egyptian ceramics from Avaris, such as Tell el-Yahudiyeh Ware, have been discovered within Kerma burials. In addition, artifacts such as scarab seals and amulets are prolific, indicating extensive trade with ancient Egypt as well as an exchange of cultural ideas. After the sacking of Kerma, the cemetery was used to host the kings of the 25th or "Napatan" dynasty of the Kingdom of Kush from Upper (Southern) Nubia.

== Religious tradition ==
Some scholars note an animistic tradition rather than a polytheistic one in pre-New Kingdom Kerma, in contrast to the later Napatan and Meroitic periods: animals depicted during the Classical Kerma period do not show anthropomorphic features like their Egyptian counterparts, and mesas like Jebel Barkal were treated in animistic fashion, After the New Kingdom Egyptian takeover of Upper Nubia, anthropomorphic deities came to prominence. This cultural exchange was bidirectional, as New Kingdom began to treat Jebel Barkal as a sacred site, a tradition they likely learned from the indigenous Animistic Kerma culture.

== Archaeology ==
=== Early 20th century ===
Early archaeology at Kerma started with an Egyptian and Sudanese survey by George Reisner, an American with joint appointments at Harvard University and the Museum of Fine Arts, Boston. Reisner later led these two institutions in the so-called "Harvard-Boston" expedition during three field seasons at Kerma (1913–1916). He worked in Egypt and Sudan for 25 years, 1907–1932.

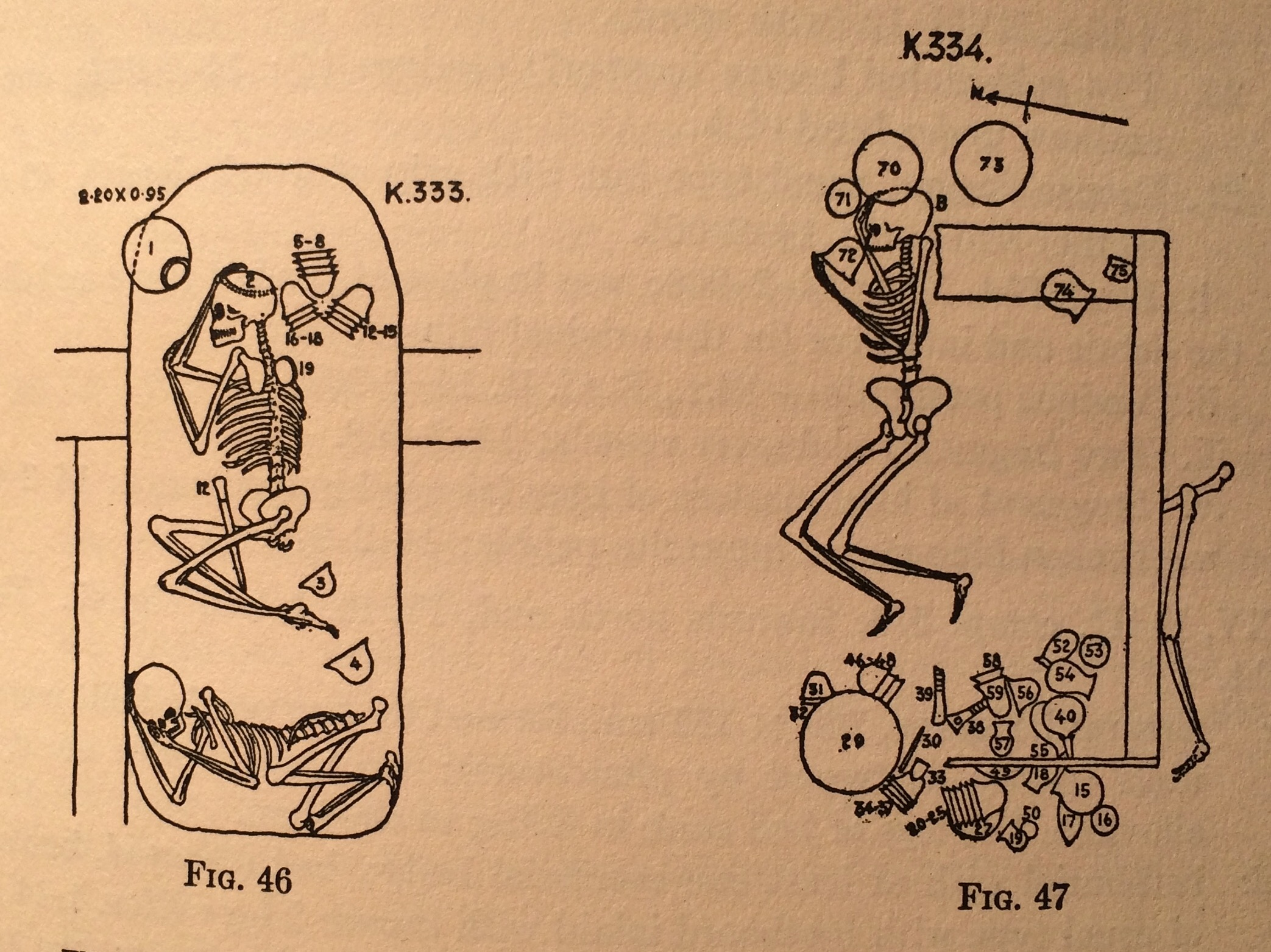
Illustration from "Excavations at Kerma" by George Reisner, printed in 1923

As Kerma was one of the earliest sites to be excavated in this region, Reisner's contributions to the region's archaeology are fundamental. A basic chronology of Kerman culture was established based on the work of Reisner's Harvard-Boston expedition; this provided the scaffolding for all other findings in the region. Reisner's precise excavation techniques, site reports, and other publications made later reinterpretation of his results possible.

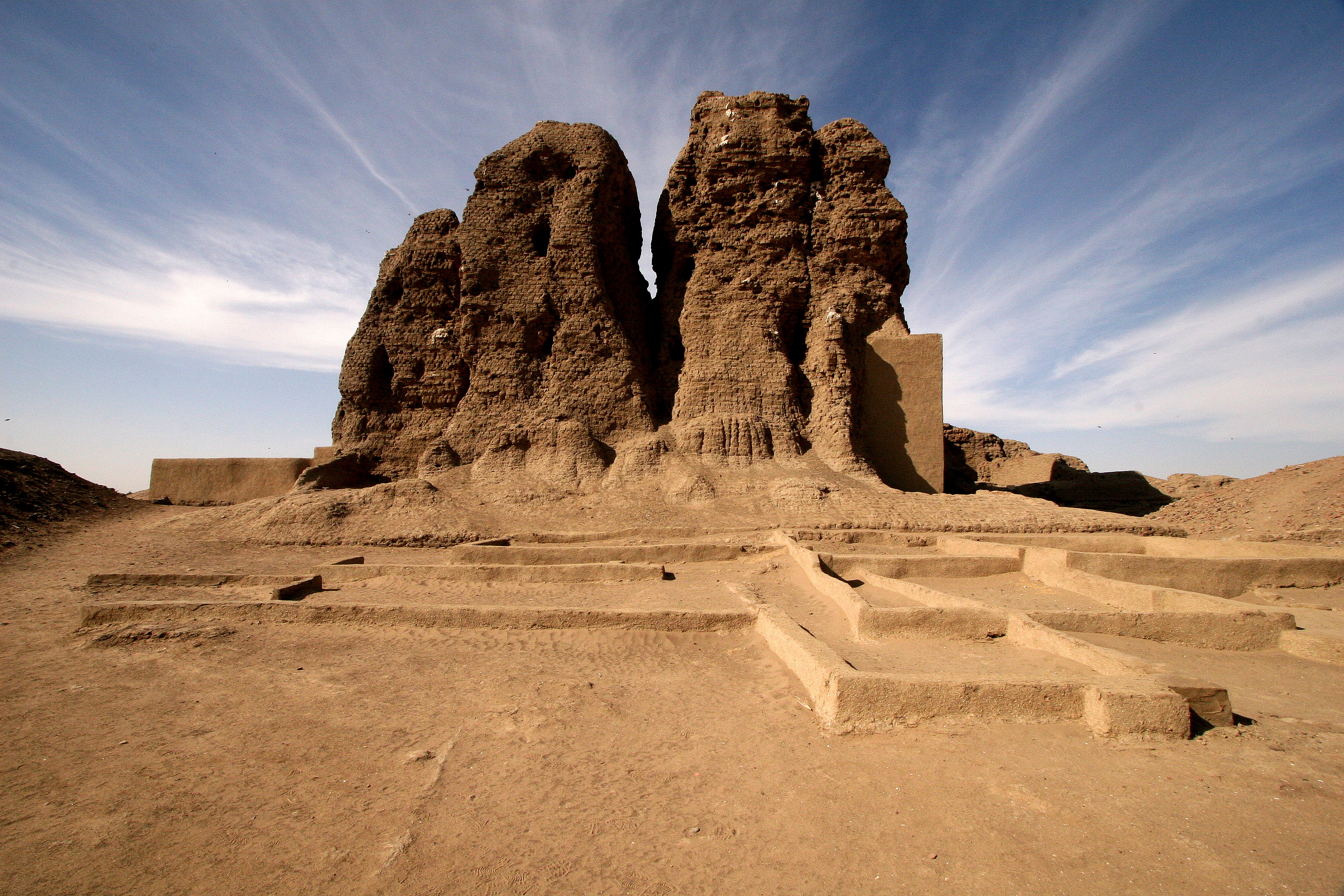
The Western Deffufa

The Lower/Western Deffufa (a massive tomb structure) was found closer to the river (19°36'2"N, 30°24'37"E); the Upper/Eastern Deffufa is a few kilometers away from the river in a cemetery (19°36'15"N, 30°26'41"E). The deceased in most burials were slightly flexed, lying on their sides. Reisner saw many links to ancient Egyptian culture through his architectural techniques and the dimensions of the Lower/Western Deffufa's base (52.3 m × 26.7 m, or 150 × 100 Egyptian cubits). He assumed it was a fort. He did not conduct further excavations of the settlement suspected to surround the Lower Deffuffa.

The Upper/Eastern Deffufa was located amidst thousands of low, round graves, with clear stylistic differences among the northern, middle, and southern parts of the cemetery. The most elaborate tombs were found in the southern part. Reisner assumed that the large, quadrangular deffufa structures were funerary chapels associated with the largest mound graves, not tombs per se. He interpreted these based on his knowledge of ancient Egyptian funerary practices, and since many of the grave goods found were Egyptian, he had no reason to think otherwise.

Reisner fit this archaeology into his understanding of ancient life along the Nile, assuming that Kerma was a satellite city of the ancient Egyptians. It was not until the late 20th century that excavations by Charles Bonnet and the University of Geneva confirmed that this was not the case. They instead uncovered a vast independent urban complex that ruled most of the Third Cataract for centuries.

=== Late 20th century to present ===
Decades after Reisner's excavations, Bonnet's refutation of the idea that Kerma was an Egyptian satellite city was accepted. "The patient and diligent work of Bonnet and his colleagues unearthed the foundations of numerous houses, workshops, and palaces, proving that as early as 2000 BC Kerma was a large urban center, presumably the capital city and a burial ground of the kings of Kush." From 1977 to 2003, Bonnet and an international team of scholars excavated at Kerma.

Bonnet's Swiss team has excavated the following types of sites at Kerma: ancient town, princely tomb, temple, residential/administrative buildings, Napatan buildings, a Napatan potter's workshop, Meroitic cemeteries, fortifications, and Neolithic grain pits and huts. Among many other unique finds, Bonnet uncovered a bronze forge in the main city. "It is within the walls of the religious center that a bronze workshop was built. The workshop consisted of multiple forges and the artisans' techniques appear to have been quite elaborate. There is no comparable discovery in Egypt or in Sudan to help us interpret these remains."

In 2003, Bonnet and his archaeological team discovered black granite statues of pharaohs of Egypt's Twenty-fifth Dynasty near Kerma. The statues are displayed onsite in the Kerma Museum.

=== Bioarchaeology ===
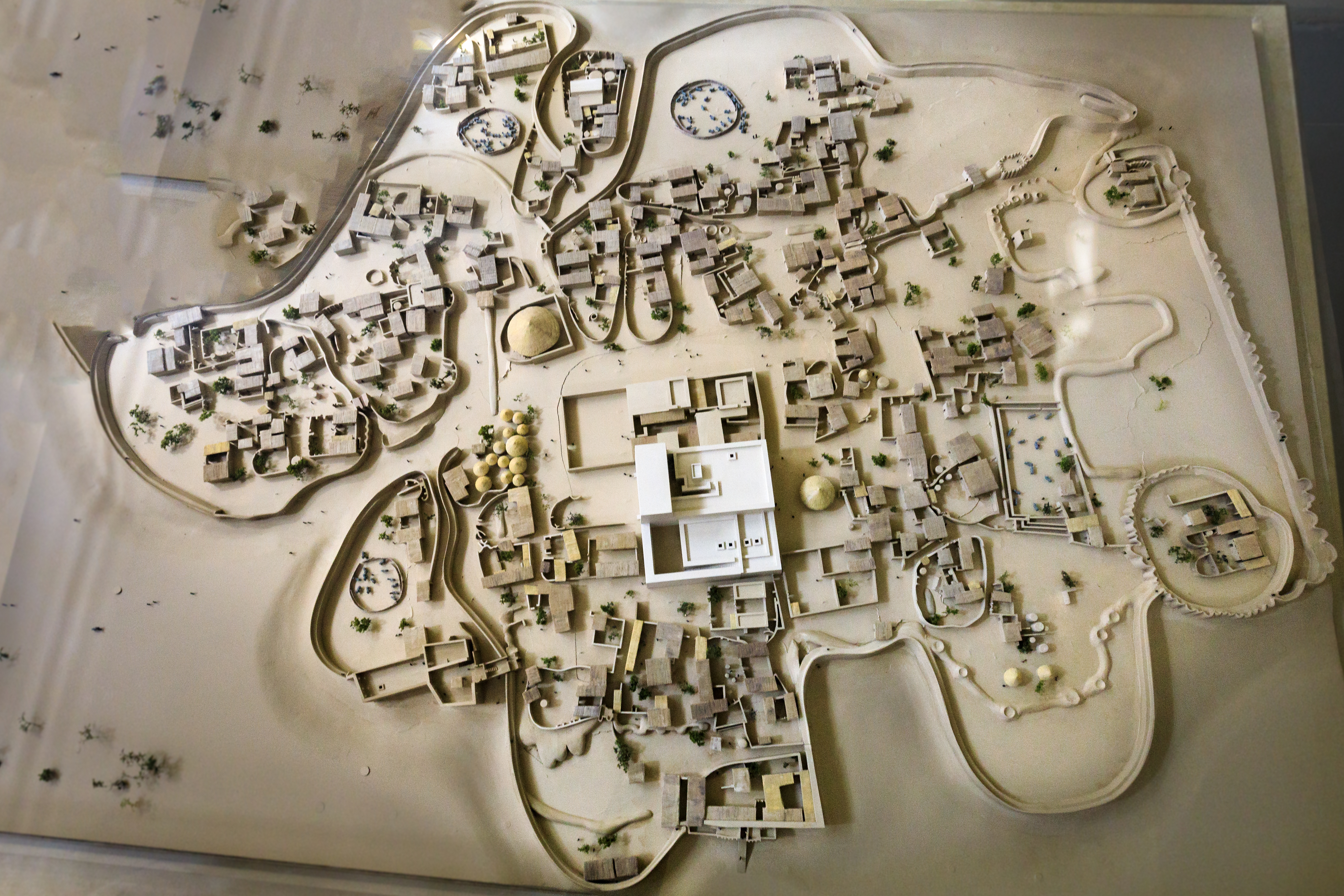
Model of the city of Kerma c. 1700 BC, National Museum of Sudan

Mortuary practices in Kerma varied over time, as can be seen in the archaeological record. The large cemetery around the Upper/Eastern Deffufa is arranged with older graves in the northern part and more-recent (and -complex) graves and tombs in the southern part. "In the Early Kerma period, 2500-2050 BC, burials are marked by a low, circular superstructure of slabs of black sandstone, stuck into the ground in concentric circles. White quartz pebbles reinforce the structure." Smaller burials surround larger tombs of important individuals. Tombs progress from simple mounds to Egyptian-inspired pyramid complexes. This transition did not begin until long after pyramids fell out of fashion in Egypt.

Bonnet notes that sacrificial victims appear and become increasingly common in the Middle Kerma period. Because burial chambers can be easily entered, one could question the likelihood of the sacrifice of a wife and/or child when a man dies without any ethnohistorical evidence to support this in the culture. In fact Buzon and Judd question this assumption by analyzing traumata and indicators of skeletal stress in these "sacrificial victims."

Most skeletons have been found in a slightly contracted or contracted position on their sides. Because of the arid desert climate, natural mummification is very common. Without the normal processes of decomposition to skeletonize the body, soft tissues, hairs, and organic grave goods are still often found (e.g., textiles, feathers, leather, fingernails). Grave goods include faience beads, cattle skulls, and pottery. Skeletal collections, like other archaeological evidence, continue to be re-examined and re-interpreted as new research questions arise. Two recent studies highlight the kinds of questions that bioarchaeologists are asking of the skeletal material excavated from Kerma.

Kendall suggests that large tombs in the Upper Deffufa contained the bodies of dozens or hundreds of sacrificed victims. A later bioarchaeological examination of these remains , with samples drawn from the "sacrificial corridors" and interments outside of the large tumulus corridors, showed no significant differences between the skeletal-stress markers of sacrificed versus non-sacrificed individuals. Accompanying individuals in the tumuli at Kerma have been interpreted as wives sacrificed upon the death of the husband, but the bioarchaeological evidence does not support this conclusion. A prior study noted no difference in the frequency of traumatic injury.

Traumatic injury in the Kerma remains is viewed through the lens of modern traumatic-injury patterns. "Many aspects of the Kerma injury pattern were comparable to clinical [modern] observations: males experienced a higher frequency of trauma, the middle-aged group exhibited the most trauma, the oldest age cohort revealed the least amount of accumulated injuries, a small group experienced multiple trauma and fractures occurred more frequently than dislocations or muscle pulls." Parry fractures, which often occur when an individual is fending off a blow from an attacker, are common. These do not necessarily result from assault, however, and Judd does acknowledge this. She does not use the same parsing strategy when considering that Colles' fractures (of the wrist, which usually occur when an object falls onto one's hands) may have resulted from being pushed from a height (as distinct from other interpersonal violence), and this is not acknowledged.

S.O.Y. Keita conducted an anthropological study in which he examined the crania of groups in the North African region, including samples from Kerma c. 2000 BC and the Maghreb c. 1500 BC, as well as First Dynasty crania from the royal tombs in Abydos, Egypt. The results determined that the predominant pattern of the First Dynasty Egyptian crania was a "Southern" or a "tropical African variant" (though other patterns were also observed), which had affinities with Kerma Kushites. The general results demonstrated greater affinity with Upper Nile Valley groups but also suggested a clear change from earlier craniometric trends. The gene flow and movement of northern officials to the important southern city may explain the findings.

== See also ==
- Doukki Gel
- Kerma culture
- African empires
- Nubian architecture
- Jebel Barkal
