= Nubian architecture =

Architecture from the African region of Nubia

Nubian architecture is diverse and ancient. Temporary or seasonal settlements have been found in Nubia dating from circa 6000 BC. These villages were roughly contemporary with the walled town of Jericho in Palestine.

== Early Period ==
The earliest Nubian architecture used perishable materials, wattle and daub, mudbricks, animal hide, and other light and supple materials. Early Nubian architecture consisted of speos, structures derived from the carving of rock, an innovation of the A-Group culture (c. 3800-3100 BCE), as seen in the Sofala Cave rock-cut temple. Much later rock-cut tombs include the burial chambers of the Kushite monarchs at El Kurru, dating from 860-650 BC. Other later examples of rock cut architecture in Nubia include the temples of Beit Wali, Gerf Hussein, Temple of Derr, Temple of Mut and temple of Amada built during the New Kingdom when Nubia was ruled by Egypt.

Two types of A-Group graves exist. One was oval in shape 0.8 metres (2 ft 7 in) deep. The second was oval in shape 1.3 metres (4 ft 3 in) deep with a deeper second chamber.

The A-Group culture vanished, followed later by the C-Group culture (2400–1550 BCE). Settlements consisted of round structures with stone floors. Structural frame was achieved with wooden or pliant materials. Mudbricks became the preferred building 1094B.C.E materials as settlements became larger. Graves were circular cylindrical superstructures made of stoned wall. The pit was filled with gravel and stones, and covered with dried mud roof or hay roof. Later, during the Second Intermediate Period of Egypt (circa 1650 to 1550 BCE), an adobe chapel was placed to the north of the grave. Graves were from El Ghaba, Kadero, Sayala, and various other sites in northern Sudan.

== Kerma ==
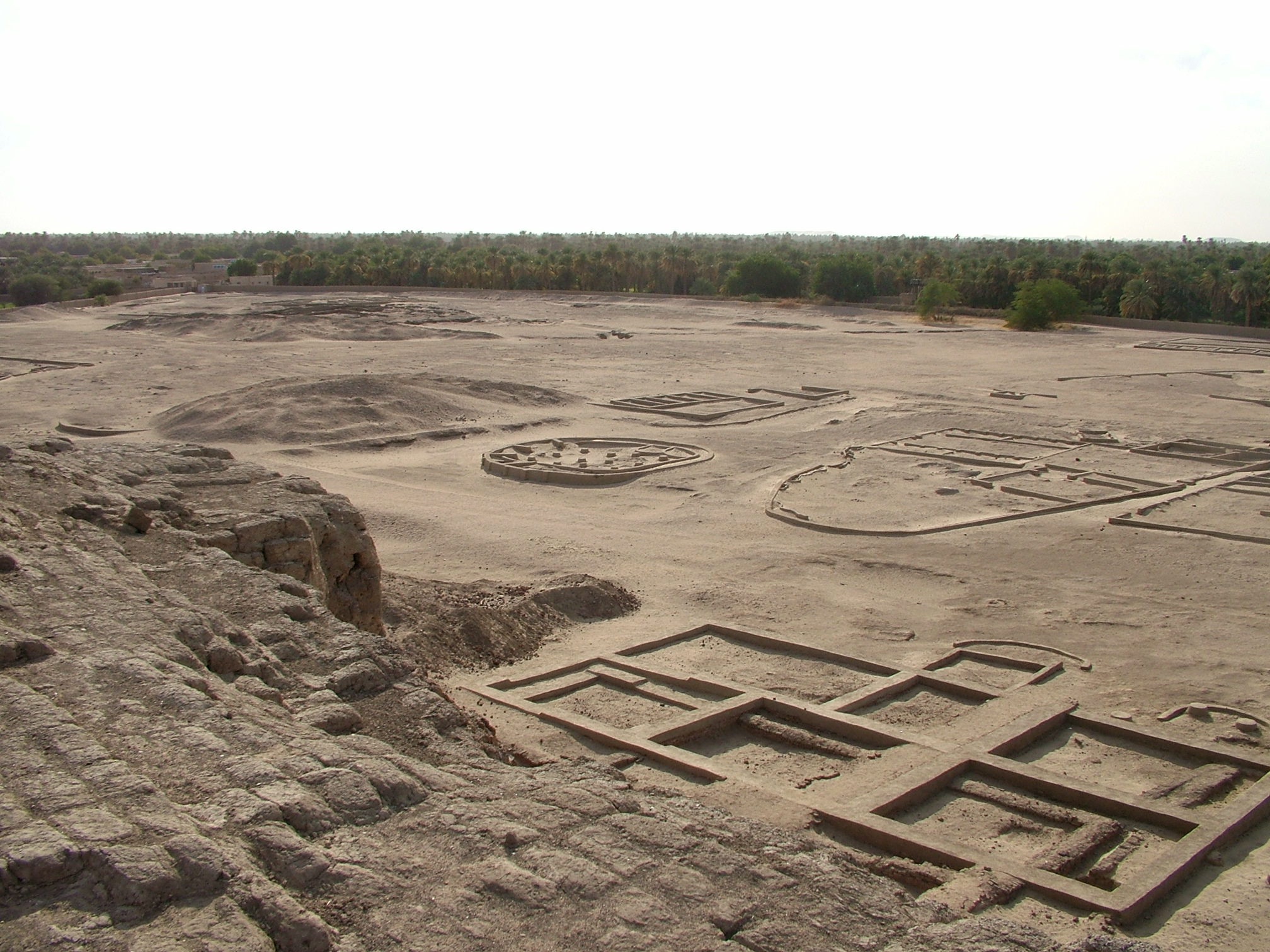
The city of Kerma

The C-Group culture was related to the Kerma Culture. Kerma was settled around 2400 BCE. It was a walled city containing a religious building, large circular dwelling, a palace, and well laid out roads. On the East side of the city, a funerary temple and chapel were laid out. It supported a population of 10,000 at its height in 1700 BCE. One of its most enduring structures was the deffufa, a mud-brick temple where ceremonies were performed on top.

The deffufa is a unique structure in Nubian architecture. Three known deffufas exist: the Western Deffufa at Kerma, an Eastern Deffufa, and a third, little-known deffufa. The Western Deffufa is 50 by 25 metres (164 by 82 ft). It is 18 metres (59 ft) tall and comprises three stories. It was surrounded by a boundary wall. Inside were chambers connected by passageways.

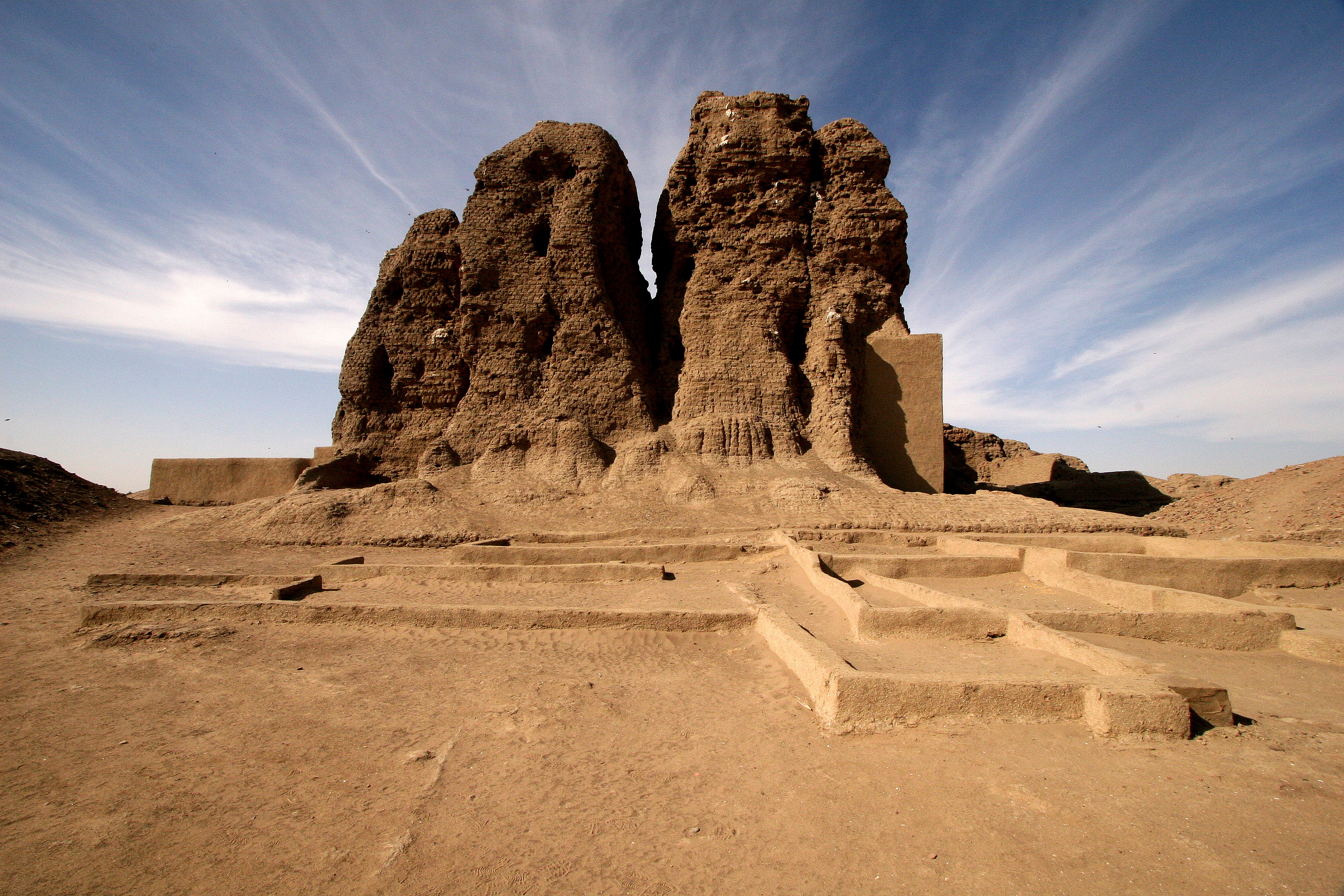
The Western Deffufa

The Eastern Deffufa lies 2 kilometres (1.2 mi) east of the Western Deffufa. The Eastern Deffufa is shorter than the Western Deffufa, just two stories high. It is considered a funerary chapel, being surrounded by 30,000 tumuli or graves. It has two columned halls. The walls are decorated with portraiture of animal in color schemes of red, blue, yellow, and black and stone-laid floors. Exterior walls were layered with stone. The third deffufa is of similar structure as the Eastern Deffufa.

The Kerma graves are distinct. They are circular pits covered with white or black pebbles in a circular mound. Four huge graves in the southern part of the site exist. They lie in rows surrounded by smaller graves. The diameter is 9 metres (30 ft), covered with circular mounds of white and black desert pebbles 3 metres (9.8 ft) high. Underneath exists a complex structure. A pathway running along the diameter is laid with mud walls, supporting the above mound. The mud walls seemed to have been once decorated. The pathway goes to a chamber with a Nubian vault and a wooden door where the king is buried. The king's bed is elaborate with stone-carved legs. The vaulted chamber lies in the center of the structure. It is estimated 300 humans and 1000 cattle were probably sacrificed with the king to accompany him in the after-life.

== Kush, Napata and the 25th dynasty. ==
Pyramids near Jebel Barkal

Between 1500–1085 BCE, Egyptian conquest and domination of Nubia was achieved. This conquest brought about the Napatan Phase of Nubian history, the birth of the Kingdom of Kush. Kush was immensely influenced by Egypt and eventually conquered it. During this phase we see the building of numerous pyramids and temples.

Of much spiritual significance to Nubian pharaohs was Jebel Barkal. Nubian pharaohs received legitimacy from the site. They held pharaonic coronation and consulted its oracle. It was thought to be the dwelling place of the deity Amun. Temples for Mut, Hathor, and Bes are also present. Thirteen temples and three palaces have been excavated.

The Temple of Amun at Jebel Barkal was arguably the most significant of the temples built in ancient Nubia. Originally constructed in the 15th century under Pharaoh Thutmose III, it was later reconstructed and modified by Kushite rulers during the 25th dynasty. In general, the architecture of most major Nubian temples was similar to the temple at Jebel Barkal.

The Temple of Amun at Jebel Barkal consisted of a pylon with entrance gates, courtyards, hypostyle halls, and a sanctuary, as well as storage rooms and, most likely, living quarters and kitchens. The temple, as well as the entire complex, was oriented facing East in order to signify the importance of the rising sun. The layout of the temple generally mirrored Egyptian temple design with the exception of later Nubian modifications.

The original temple was constructed using talatat blocks that were made of limestone. The main entrance, pylon, and first courtyard, which contained ten columns, was constructed by Egyptian Pharaoh Amenhotep IV. Tutankhamun added an additional courtyard, while Ramses II contributed two more pylons, a hypostyle courtyard, and a chapel. The materials used during this period included a mixture of limestone, sandstone, and green tiles.

Taharqa column at Karnak temple

The largest expansion occurred under Kushite ruler Piye (753-723 BCE), who gave the temple its final length of roughly 150 meters. Piye added a large farm containing more columns, and two additional pylons. Each pylon stood around 3.5 to 4 meters tall, while the column height ranged anywhere from 5 to 15 meters depending on its position in the temple. Finally, Piye added a long hypostyle hall with 50 columns made of bricks and sandstone.

As time went on, Piye and other Kushite rulers made small additions to the temple such as storage areas and possibly living quarters or residential areas for the priests. Other additions to the temple by Kushite rulers included renovations of chapels, altars and the main sanctuary. They also wanted to emphasize the connection between Jebel Barkal and Amun, so they added various different statues, symbols, hieroglyphs, and paintings depicting a range of scenes linking the Kushite Kingdom to Amun. Notable examples include the statues of Kush ruler Taharqa being found near the temple and Kushite rulers' names being incorporated in the sanctuary’s hieroglyphs. Overall, the architecture of the Temple of Amun at Jebel Barkal had a significant Kushite influence during the 25th dynasty.

The city of Napata has not been fully excavated. Some of the temples were started by various pharaohs and were added on by succeeding pharaohs, beginning with Egyptian pharaohs. Reisner excavated Jebel Barkal, labeling its monuments B for Barkal. Some are as follows: B200 (temple of Taharqa), B300 (Taharqa's other temple of Mut, Hathor and Bes), B500 (temple of Amun), B501 (outer court), B502 (hypostyle hall), B700 (temple), B800sub (temple of Alara of Nubia), B1200 (palace). Psamtik II of the Twenty-sixth Dynasty of Egypt sacked the region in 593 BCE, destroying all Nubian statues in B500.

Nubian pyramids were constructed on three major sites: El-Kurru, Nuri, and Meroë. More pyramids were constructed and for the longest time in Nubia than in Egypt. Nubia contains 223 pyramids. They were smaller than Egyptian pyramids. Nubian pyramids were for kings and queens. The general construction of Nubian pyramids consisted of steep walls, a chapel facing East, stairway facing East, and a chamber access via the stairway.

El-Kurru was the first major site. It is located 13 kilometres (8.1 mi) south from Jebel Barkal. It was made of sandstone. It range from 10 to 30 metres (33 to 98 ft) in height. About ten pharaohs and fourteen queens were buried at El-Kurru.

Nuri was another important pyramid site, 6 miles northeast of Jebel Barkal. It housed the tombs of twenty pharaohs and fifty four queens. The pharaoh's pyramids range from 39.5 to 65 metres (130 to 213 ft) in height. The queen's pyramids are 9 to 17 metres (30 to 56 ft). The tombs were cut out of bedrock. The pharaoh's chamber contained three interconnecting chambers. The queen's contain two interconnecting chambers.

== Meroë ==
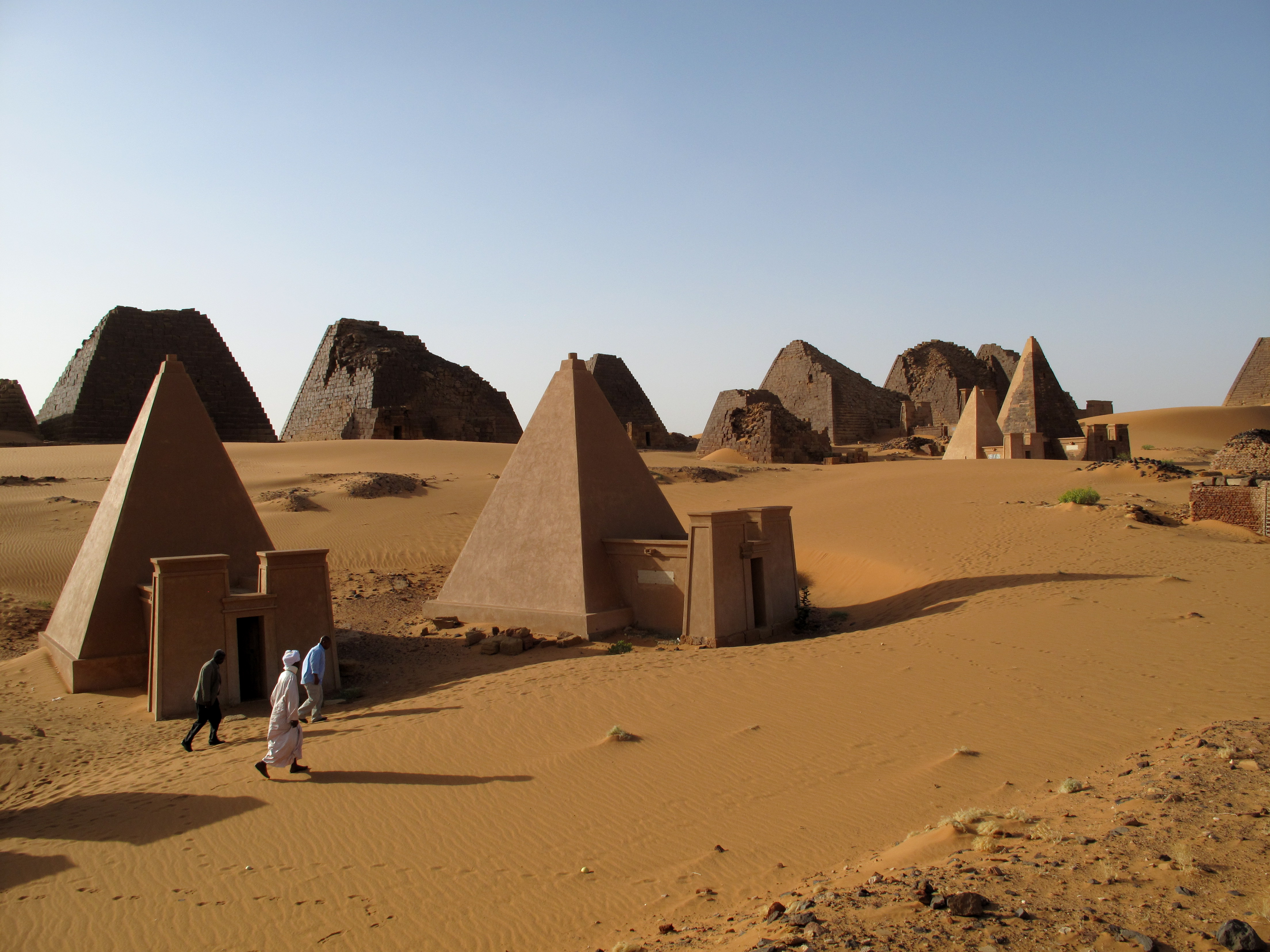
Pyramids of Meroë

The third Nubian Pyramid site, Meroë, consists of three cemeteries which are the location of approximately 200 pyramids. These three cemeteries are known as the Northern, Southern, and Western Cemeteries, based on respective location. The Western Cemetery contains over 800 graves and 80 pyramidal structures, compared to the 38 superstructures in the Northern Cemetery and 24 located in the Southern Cemetery. The construction of these pyramids spans from the 2nd century B.C.E to the 4th century C.E., with burial practices differing in each site. The Western Cemetery was typically used for the burial of non-ruling family members and elite individuals, while the Southern Cemetery was first selected for royal burials. After there was no available space left in the Southern Cemetery, rulers' burials continued in the Northern Cemetery.

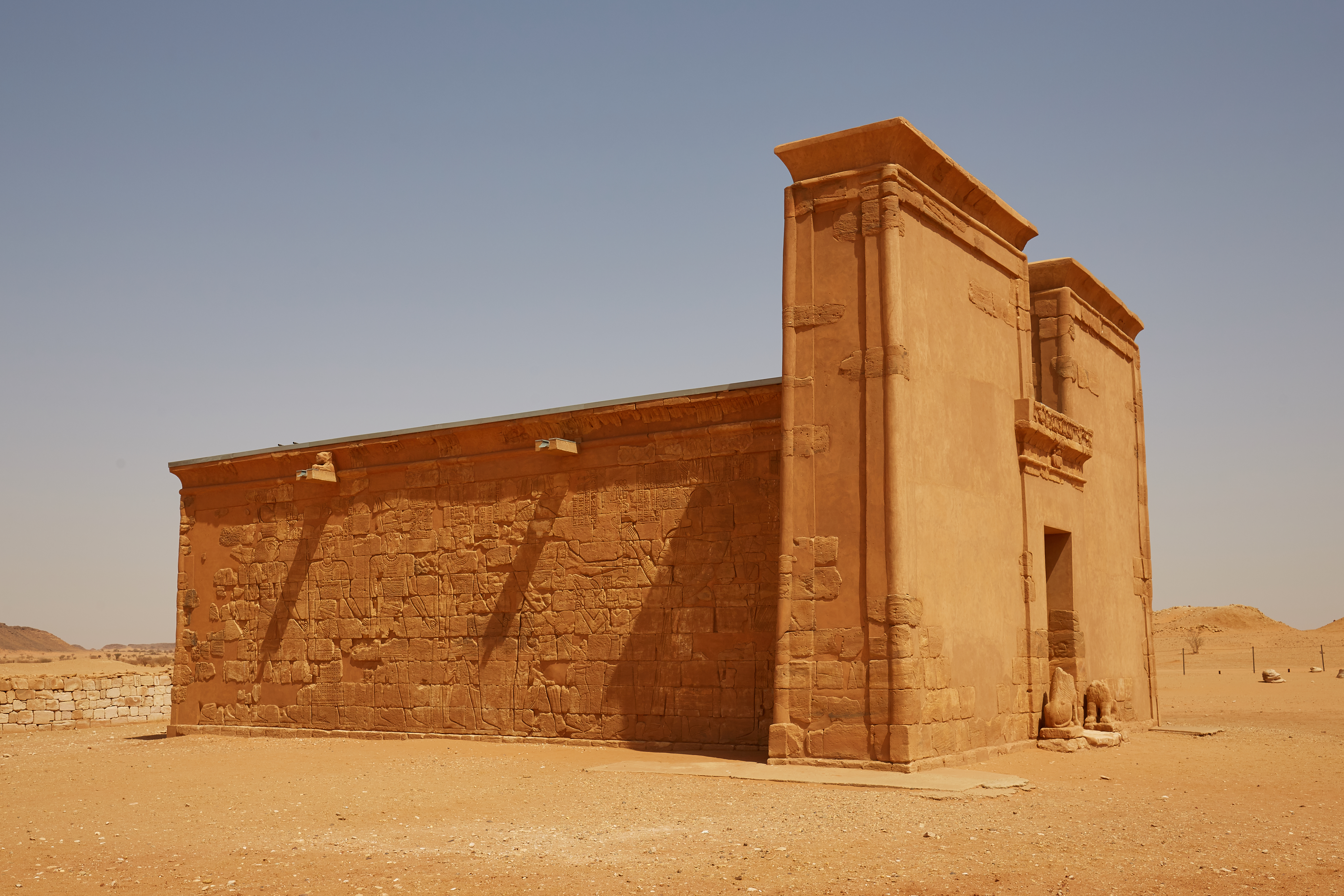
Temple of Apedemak in Musawwarat es-sufra

Nubian pyramidal construction varies in many ways from Egyptian construction. Besides typically recognized differences such as size and age, both of which the Gizeh pyramids exceed those in Meroe, the Sudanese structures have a much steeper incline, oriented to face between the North East and South, and were constructed with different organization. For example, deposits were found under the corners of many pyramids at Meroë. These deposits contained ceramics, fragments of stones, and other precious items. The Meroitic pyramids contain burial chambers which were dug into the ground, and after the owner’s death, the superstructure was constructed. This order of operations is unlike that in Egypt, where nobility often participated in the design and construction of their own pyramid and were placed in a burial chamber after death. Similarly, the deposits were not typical of Egyptian burials.

In terms of construction, the remnants of cedar wood poles found in the center of stone shafts indicate the use of shaduf to lift each block. It is therefore believed that the construction timeline often did not take more than a year to complete, even for the largest pyramids.

There has been some difficulty in determining the member of nobility who was buried at each pyramidal location. This is due to many factors, such as the lack of written records associated with the sites, poor preservation of inscriptions, difficulty with stratigraphic dating, and chronological gaps in nobility. George Andrew Reisner, an American archeologist, created the basic framework for the dating of each pyramid based on his excavation in 1923. In his analysis he considered the architecture, prominence, and decoration of each structure.

The ancient Nubians established a system of geometry including early versions of sun clocks. Many are located at the sites of Meroë. During the Meroitic period in Nubian history the ancient Nubians used a trigonometric methodology similar to the Egyptians.

== Christian Nubia ==
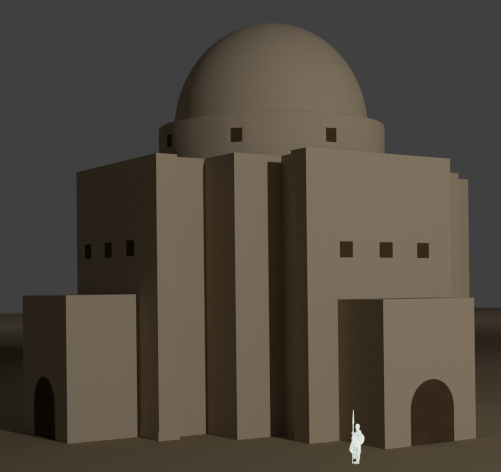
Reconstruction of the 9th century "Cruciform Church" of Dongola.

The Christianization of Nubia began in the 6th century AD. Its most representative architecture are churches. They are based on Byzantium basilicas. The structures are relatively small and made of mudbricks. The church is rectangular in shape with North and South isles. Columns are used to divide the nave. On the East side is the apse. The altar stood in front of the apse. The area between the altar and apse was called the haikal. At the West was a tower or upper room also in the South corner and North corner. Doors were in the North and South walls. A few churches such as Faras Cathedral survived. Church painting with biblical themes were extensive but few survived. The best surviving church painting were on the Rivergate Church of Faras and the Church of Ab El Qadir.

Vernacular architecture of the Christian period is scarce. Architecture of Soba is the only one that has been excavated . The structures are of sun dried bricks, same as present day Sudan, except for an arch.

One prominent feature of Nubian churches are vaults made out of mudbricks. The mudbrick structure was revived by Egyptian architect Hassan Fathy after rediscovering the technique in the Nubian village of Abu al-Riche. The technology is advocated by environmentalist as environmentally friendly and sustainable, since it makes use of pure earth without the need of timber.

== Islamic Nubia ==
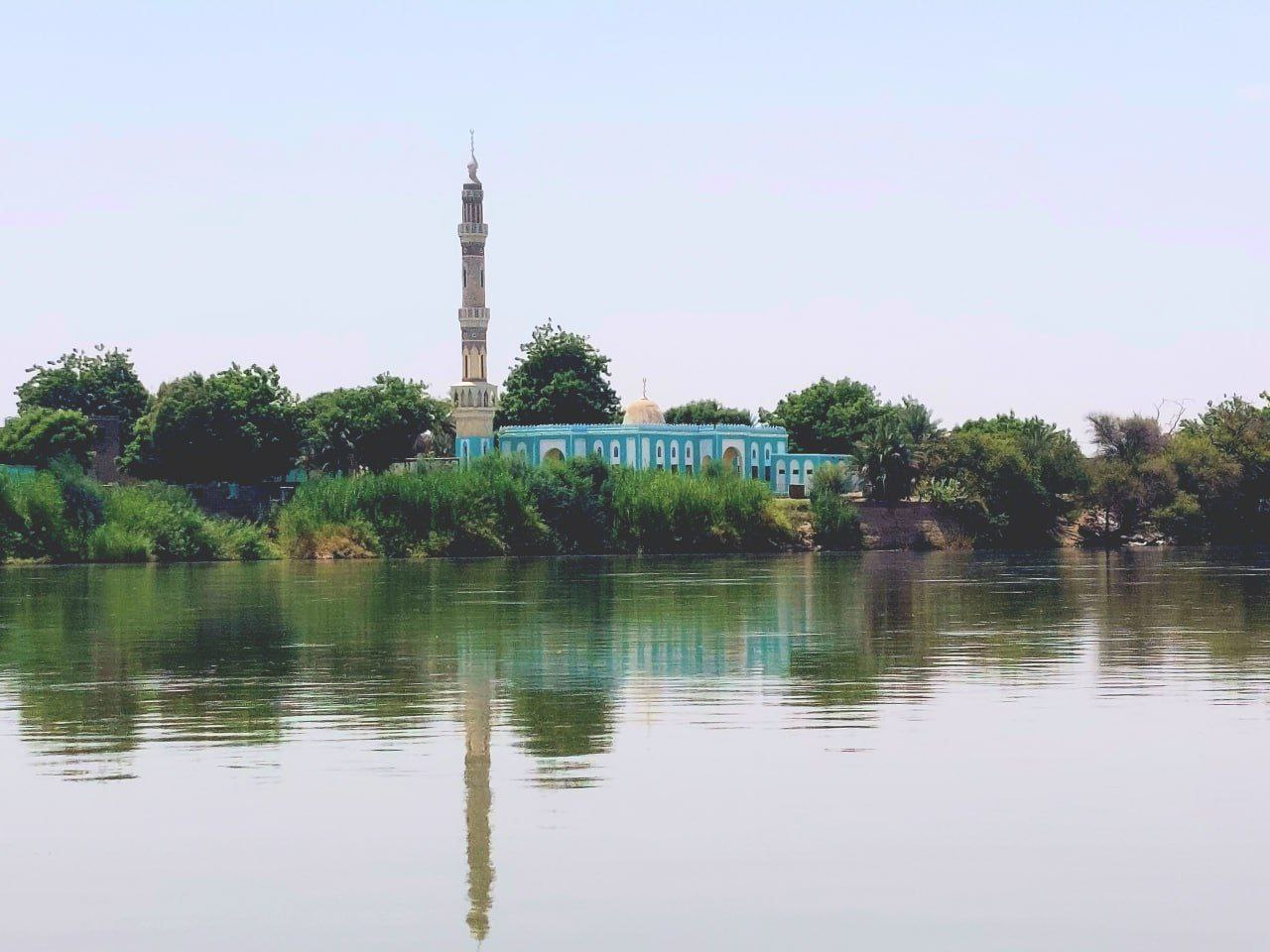
Mosque featuring traditional Nubian design, in the bank of the Nile River in Kerma Al- Nuzul

The conversion to Islam was a slow, gradual process, with almost 600 years of resistance. Most of the architecture of the period are mosques built of mudbricks. One of the first attempt at conquest was by Egyptian-Nubian, Ibn Abi Sarh. Ibn Abi Sarh was a Muslim leader who tried to conquer all Nubia in the 8th century AD. It was almost a complete failure. A treaty called the Baqt shaped Egyptian-Nubian relations for six centuries and permitted the construction of a mosque in the Nubian capital of Old Dongola for Muslim travelers. By the middle of the 14th century, Nubia had been converted to Islam. The royal Church of Dongola was converted into a mosque. Numerous other churches were converted to mosque.

Graves were simple pits, with bodies pointing to Mecca. Some of the unique structures were the gubbas, graves reserved for Muslim saints. They were whitewashed domes made of adobe bricks.
