= Ramesses III prisoner tiles =

Egyptian archeological artifacts

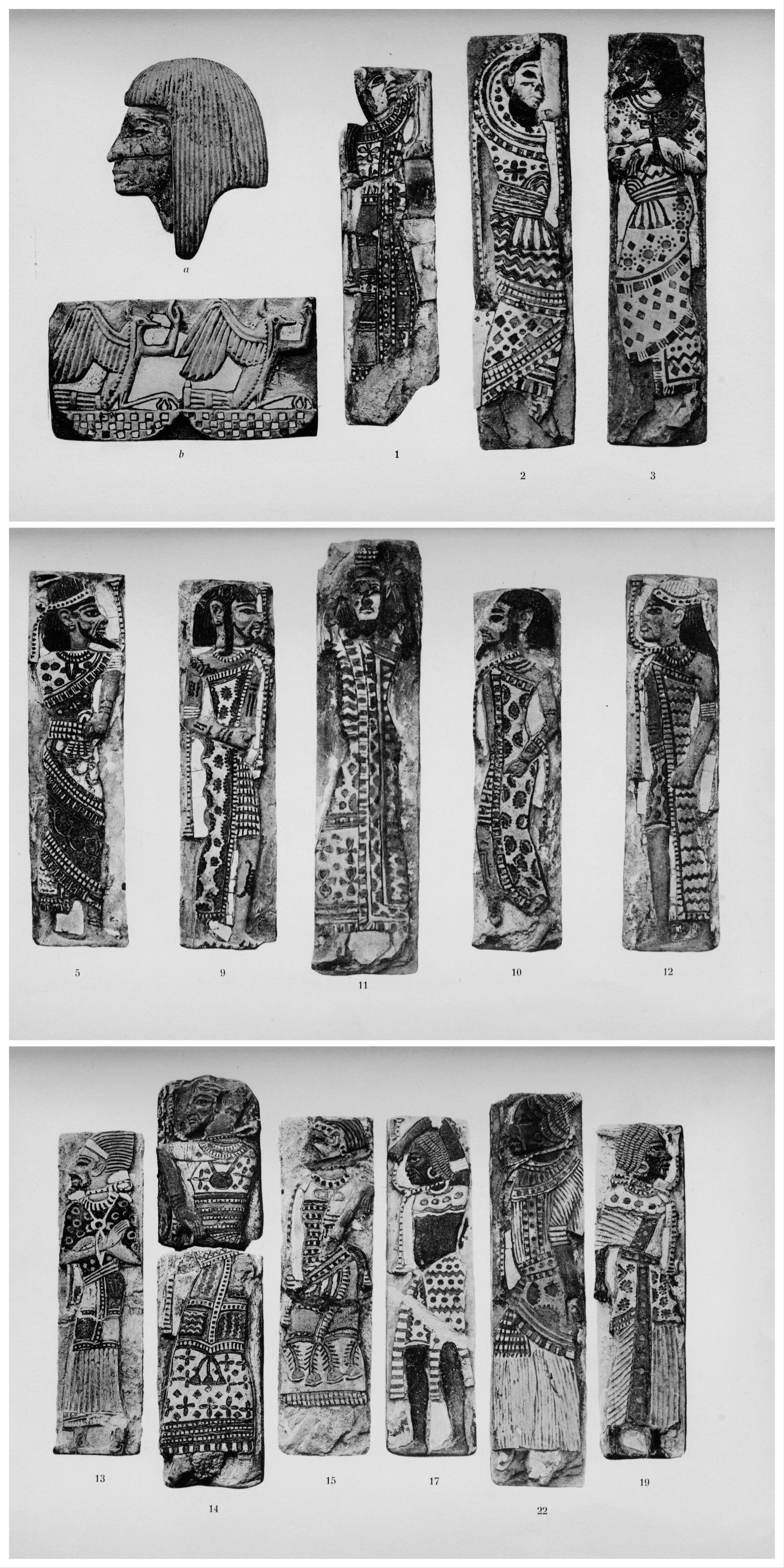
Tiles in the Egyptian Museum catalogued in 1911

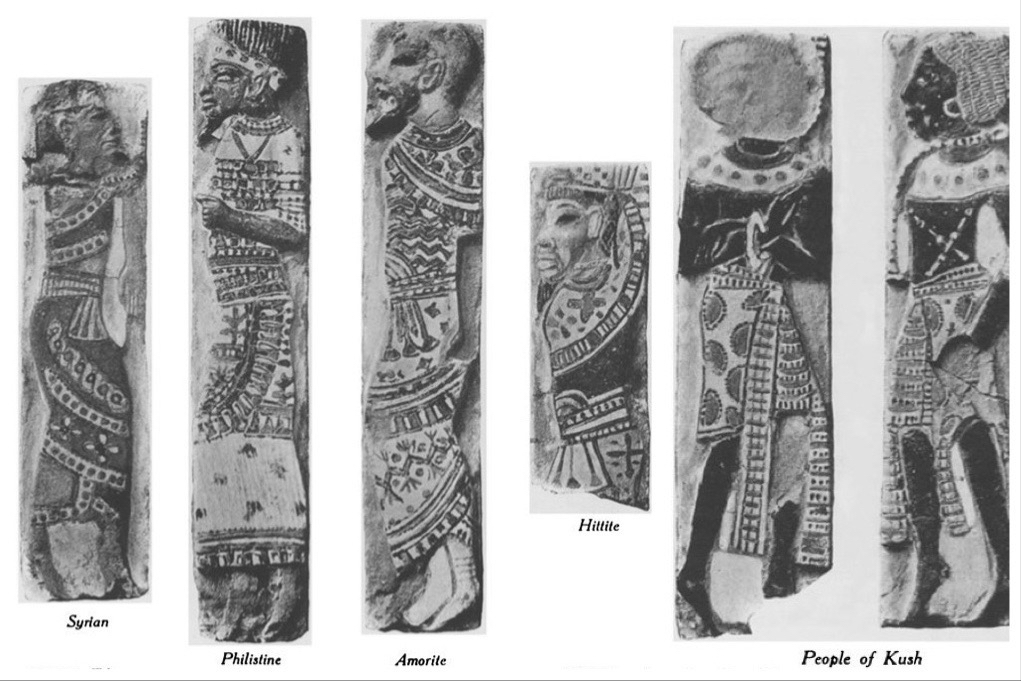
Tiles catalogued in 1908 by the Museum of Fine Arts, Boston.

The Ramesses III prisoner tiles are a collection of Egyptian faience depicting prisoners of war, found in Ramesses III's palace at Medinet Habu (adjacent to the Mortuary Temple at Medinet Habu) and Tell el-Yahudiyeh. Large numbers of faience tiles have been found in these areas by sebakh-diggers since 1903; the best known are those depicting foreign people or prisoners. Many were found in excavated rubbish heaps.

They are considered of significant historical and ethnographical interest, given the representation of neighbouring populations during the Twentieth Dynasty of Egypt (1189 BC–1077 BC).

Most are in the Egyptian Museum in Cairo, as well as the Museum of Fine Arts, Boston.

== Description ==
=== Location and size ===
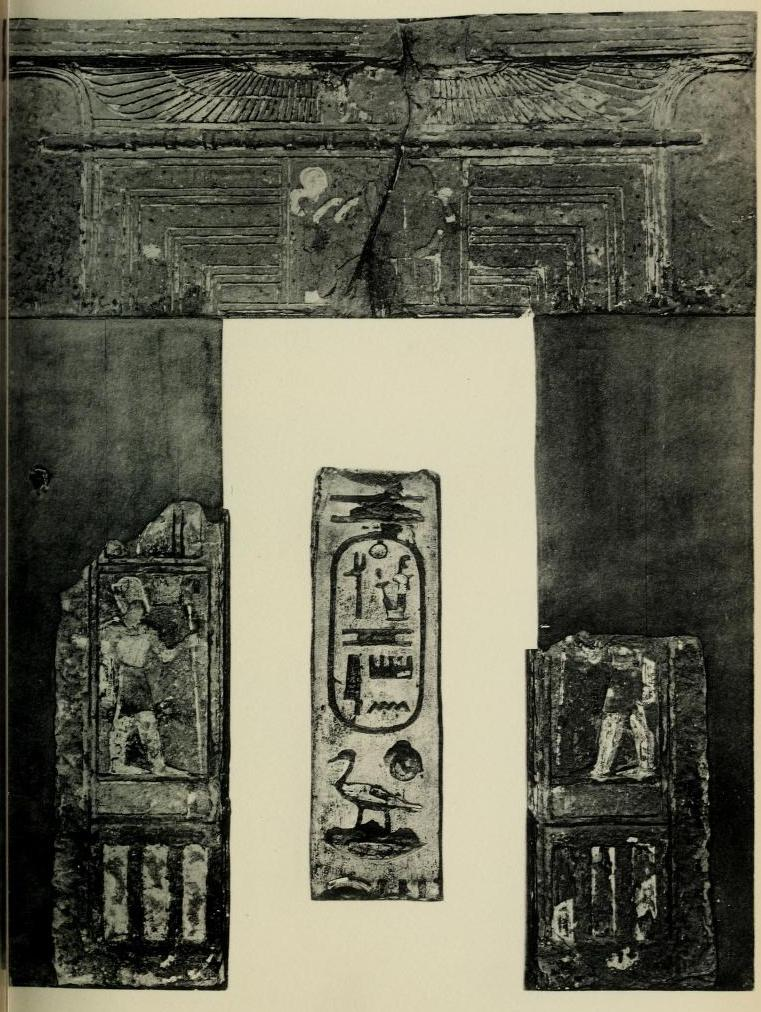
Doorway at Medinet Habu showing the original location of the tiles at the bottom of either side.

Tiles were found in 1870 at Tell el-Yahoudieh and in 1903 in Medinet Habu. Those of Tell el-Yahoudieh are larger, with a width of circa 10.5 centimetres (4.1 in), whilst those are Medinet Habu fall into two groups 30 by 7 centimetres (11.8 in × 2.8 in) and 25 by 6.5 centimetres (9.8 in × 2.6 in). All the tiles are rectangular, with a base thickness of 1.0–1.2 centimetres (0.39–0.47 in), and together with the relief sculpture of the people, the total thickness is 1.8–2.0 centimetres (0.71–0.79 in).

The Medinet Habu prisoner tiles were originally located in three rectangular cells on either side of the palace doorways, each of 30.5 centimetres (12.0 in) in height and 8 centimetres (3.1 in) in width.

In all the tiles, the prisoners are shown standing up. In some tiles, the soles of the prisoners' feet rest on the ground; in others they may be interpreted as running or hanging. The prisoners' arms are often tied, and in other tiles a white and black rope with acorns at the ends is shown around the neck.

=== Identification and provenance ===
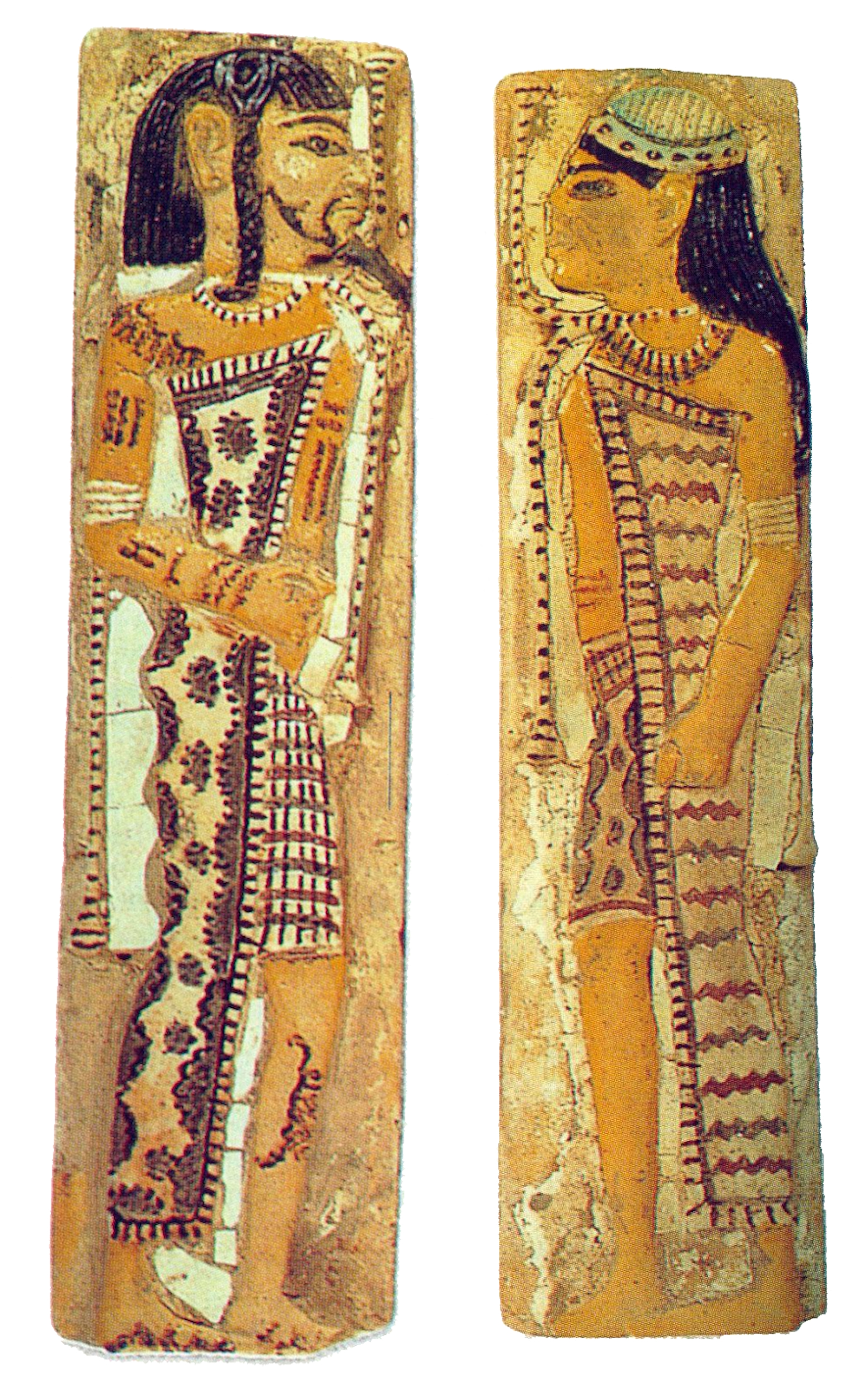
Ancient Egyptian ceramic tile of Libyans (Ramesses III prisoner tiles, 1189–1077 BCE)

In his 1911 paper on the tiles, French Egyptologist Georges Daressy, of the Egyptian Museum in Cairo, noted that the tiles have no inscriptions, so identification of the peoples shown required a comparison of the drawings with previously known temple bas-reliefs or tomb paintings, giving some uncertainty:

Unfortunately, there is no inscription on these tiles fixing the name of the peoples represented; we are forced to compare with the bas-reliefs of the temples or the paintings of the tombs to find a similar type and we are sometimes perplexed.

Formal excavation work at Medinet Habu by the Egyptian Antiquities Service (EAS) ended in 1899, but work continued by local fellahin sebakh-diggers (sebakh is the nitrogen-rich remains of ancient mud brick, dug up to be used as fertilizer). In 1903, the fellahin discovered remains of overturned doorways, still partly covered with their original decoration in enamelled tiles. Some pieces disappeared, but most were collected by the "ghafirs" and sent by Howard Carter, then Chief Inspector of the EAS in Upper Egypt, to the Cairo Museum, together with four of the pillars and an overdoor to which they had belonged. The Egyptian Museum tablets are numbered JE 36261 a-b, 36271, 36399, 36440 a-c, 36441 a-c, 36457 a-k, as well as one prior to the 1903 accessions numbered JE 27525.

The Boston Museum of Fine Arts noted in 1908 that the tiles' "provenance is a matter of question". They were purchased in 1903 on behalf of the museum by Albert Lythgoe from Luxor-based antiquities dealer Mohamed Mohassib; the purchase was made as part of a group (03.1566-03.1577; 03.1578a-i).

== Gallery ==
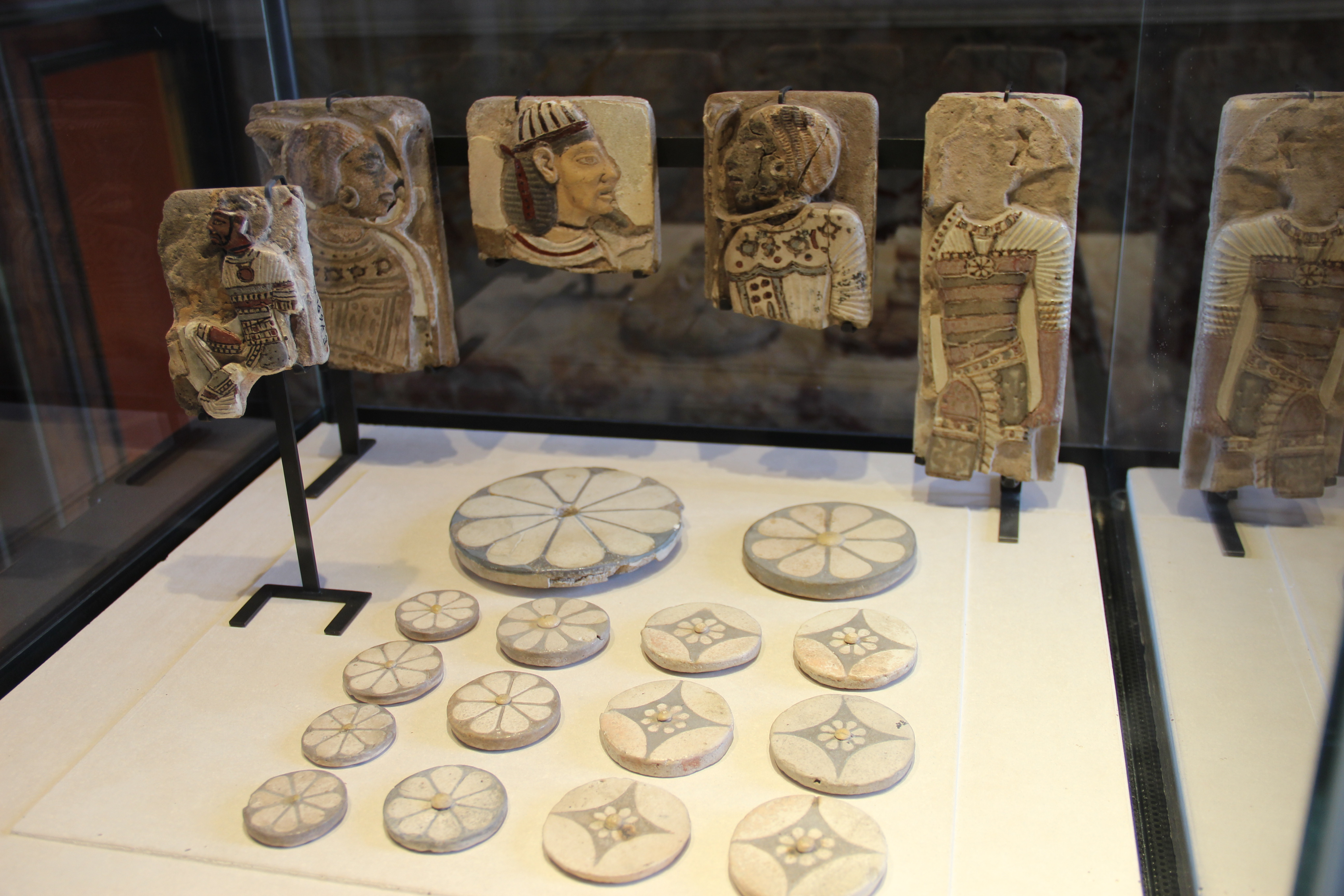
Display at the Louvre (E 4855 and E 7691 A-D)

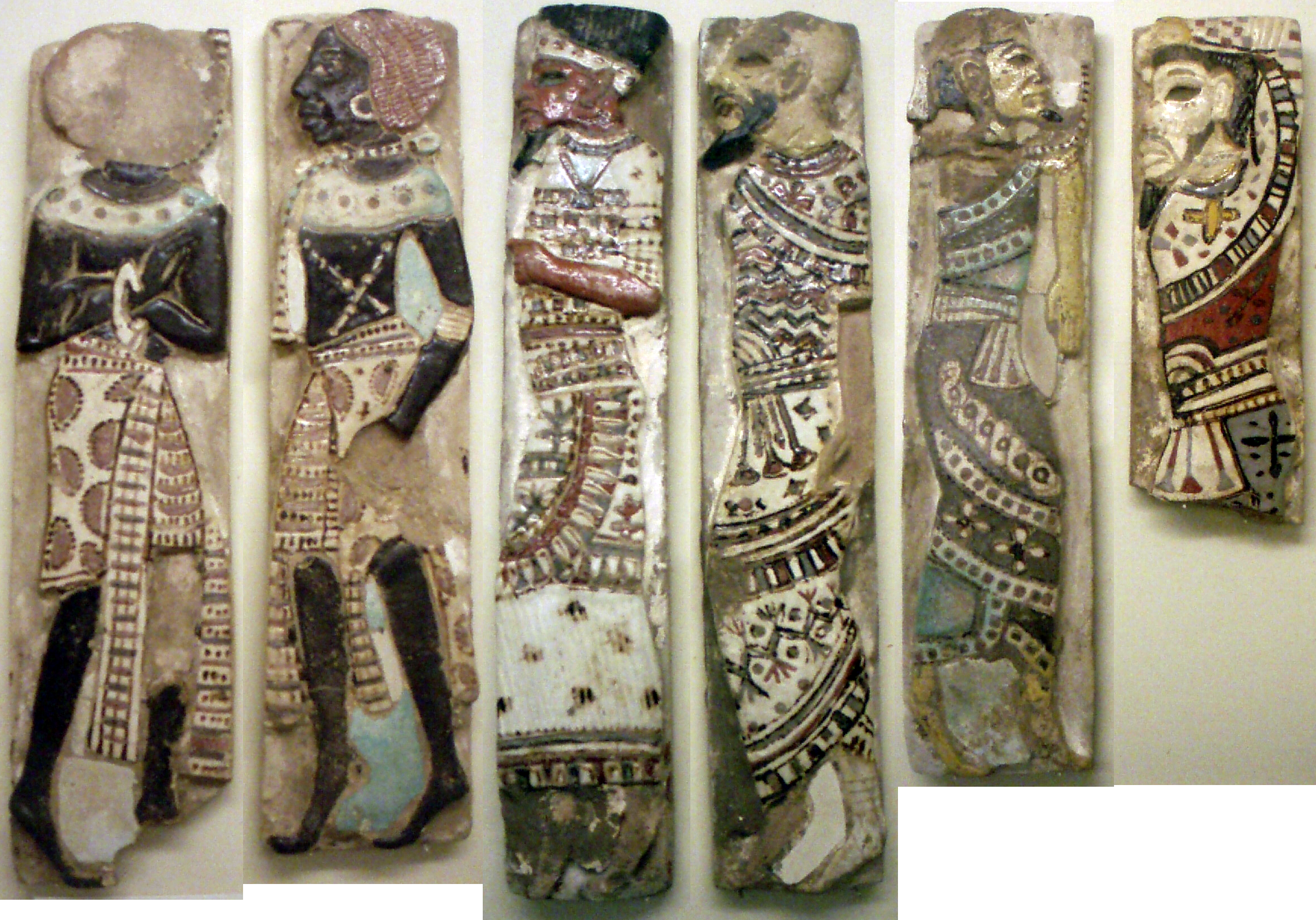
Compilation from the Boston Museum of fine arts

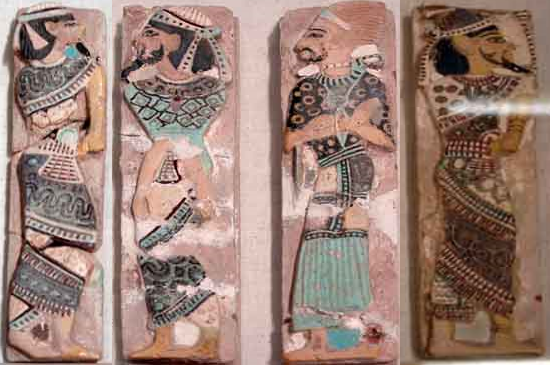
Compilation from the Egyptian Museum in Cairo

== Bibliography ==
=== General sources ===
- Florence Dunn Friedman; Cleveland Museum of Art; Rhode Island School of Design, Museum of Art; Kimbell Art Museum (1 February 1998). Gifts of the Nile: ancient Egyptian faience. Thames and Hudson. ISBN 9780500237540.

=== Medinet Habu tiles ===
- Hölscher, Uvo [in German] (1941). The Excavation of Medinet Habu: The Mortuary Temple of Ramses III, Part II (OIP55) (PDF). University of Chicago Oriental Institute Staff. ISBN 978-0-598-51484-4.
- Daressy, Georges (1911). "Plaquettes émaillées de Medinet-Habou". Annales du Service des Antiquités de l'Égypte. XI: 49–63 and Pls. I–IV.
- Eduard Meyer, "Bericht über eine Expedition nach Ägypten zur Erforschung der Darstellungen der Fremdvölker" (Preussische Akademie der Wissenschaften, Berlin, Sitzungsberichte, 1913, pp. 769-801) Nos. 1-11.
- LER (December 1908). "Egyptian Portraiture of the XX Dynasty". Museum of Fine Arts Bulletin. 6 (36): 47–50. JSTOR 4423408.
- Capart, Documents pour servir à l'étude de l'art égyptien II (Paris, 1931) Pl. 77.

=== Tell el-Yahoudieh tiles ===
- Émile Brugsch, 1886, On et Onion, Recueil de travaux, volume VII, p.1
- Thomas Hayter Lewis, 1881, Tel el-Yahoudeh, Transactions of the Society of Biblical Archaeology, volume VII, p.177
