= Leontopolis (Heliopolis) =

Archaeological site in Egypt

- Tell el Yehudiye (the Jewish tell)
- Location within Egypt
- 30°17′36.2″N 31°19′57.4″E
- Type: Ancient location
- Location: Kafr Ash Shubak, Heliopolite Nome
- Region: Lower Egypt

Site notes
- Website: Tell el-Yahudiya
- Ney-ta-hut: 'The Delta site of Tell el-Yahudiya (Mound of the Jews) probably (..) dates to at least as early as the Middle Kingdom and seems to have been occupied right up to the Roman Period. Tell el-Yahudiya was first excavated and published by Naville in 1890, Petrie in 1906 and later investigated by du Buisson for the French Archaeological Institute.'

Leontopolis is the Koine Greek name of a city that may correspond to either the modern area of Tell el Yehudiye or Tell el-Yahudiya ("the Jewish tell"). It was an ancient city of Egypt in the 13th nome of Lower Egypt (the Heliopolite Nome) on the Pelusiac branch of the Nile. This site is known for its distinctive pottery known as Tell el-Yahudiyeh Ware.

The site was part of the Land of Onias, after Onias IV, who built a new Jewish temple at Leontopolis to rival the Maccabean hierarchy in Jerusalem, and was home to a Jewish population.

== Discovery ==
pr Z1 ra A40 Hr r Z1	t	iwn nw niwt

pr-rꜥ ḥr mḥt jwnw

The Residence of Ra to the north of Heliopolis
in hieroglyphs

Era: New Kingdom
(1550–1069 BC)

n A i i Z3A t&A Hwt t pr niwt
nꜣjj tꜣ ḥ(w)t
in hieroglyphs
Era: 2nd Intermediate Period
(1650–1550 BC)

Linant identified the site in 1825, but Niebuhr had identified it earlier, in the late 18th century.

== Earthwork enclosures ==
The site includes some massive rectangular earthwork enclosures of the late Middle Kingdom or Second Intermediate Period. They measure around 515m by 490m, and their purpose is probably defensive. These earthen walls were sloping and plastered on the outer face, and almost vertical on the inner face. Egyptian parallels for such a structure are lacking. This enclosure is often interpreted as a fortification built by the Hyksos; it is generally known as the "Hyksos Camp". There are also cemeteries from the Middle Kingdom and later. Ramesses II 's temple and palace have also been excavated. Also, there was a palace of Ramesses III with some fine decorations.

== Jewish temple ==
In the reign of Ptolemy VI Philometor (180–145 BC) a temple modelled after the Temple in Jerusalem was founded by an exiled High Priest of Israel often identified as Onias IV, (Josephus states that both Onias IV and Onias III built the temple at different points in his writing, and overall records a confused genealogy for the priests). The temple was founded on the site of a pagan temple dedicated to Bubastis-of-the-fields. The Hebrew colony, which was attracted by the establishment of their national worship at Leontopolis, and which was increased by the refugees from the oppressions of the Seleucid kings in Judea, flourished there for more than three centuries afterwards. In the aftermath of the First Jewish–Roman War, around 73 or 74 CE, Vespasian destroyed the Leontopilite temple, fearing another revolt.

Josephus records in The Jewish War that the temple was a tower, made of large stones, 60 cubits high, surrounded by a wall of burnt brick with stone gates. He states that the altar was similar to Jerusalem's, but it had a single lamp of gold that hung from golden chain instead of a Temple menorah. In Antiquities of the Jews, he states that the temple overall resembled the Jerusalem temple, which potentially indicates that the temple underwent renovations, initially resembling the Jerusalem temple more strongly and over time becoming a tower-like structure.

It has been suggested that the temple allowed women to serve as priests due to a funerary inscription reading "Marin the priestess". Those who support this idea, or the idea that Marin had an official function in the temple that was distinct from the male priests, state that there is precedent in the Torah for women performing cultic functions and that Egyptian and Greek women in Egypt took up an active priestess role, and that there was enough time for Jews associated with the Leontopolis Temple to have assimilated certain local practices by the time Marin lived. They think she could have played music, poured libations, or prepared sacrifices. It is also possible this inscription meant she was the daughter or wife of a male priest, as no other community allowed women to serve in such roles. Not enough evidence exists to make a definitive conclusion regarding any of these options.

While Tell el-Yahudiya was part of the Land of Onias (the term being used on one of the epitaphs found there), it is not universally accepted as being Leontopolis, and therefore, the site of Oniad Temple. One problem is that Roman sources tell us that Leontopolis was 180 stadia (about 33 kilometers) away from Memphis, which is not the distance between Memphis and Tell el-Yahudiya (186 stadia, about 46 kilometres (29 mi)). Further, identification relies upon the fact that the site's name indicates Jewish presence and the presence of images of Bubastis (Bast) being found at the site, neither of which would be unique in the area. The area atop the mound is not sufficient to host a temple or a city as Josephus recorded. Several other common pieces of evidence are also of dubious quality.

== Gallery ==
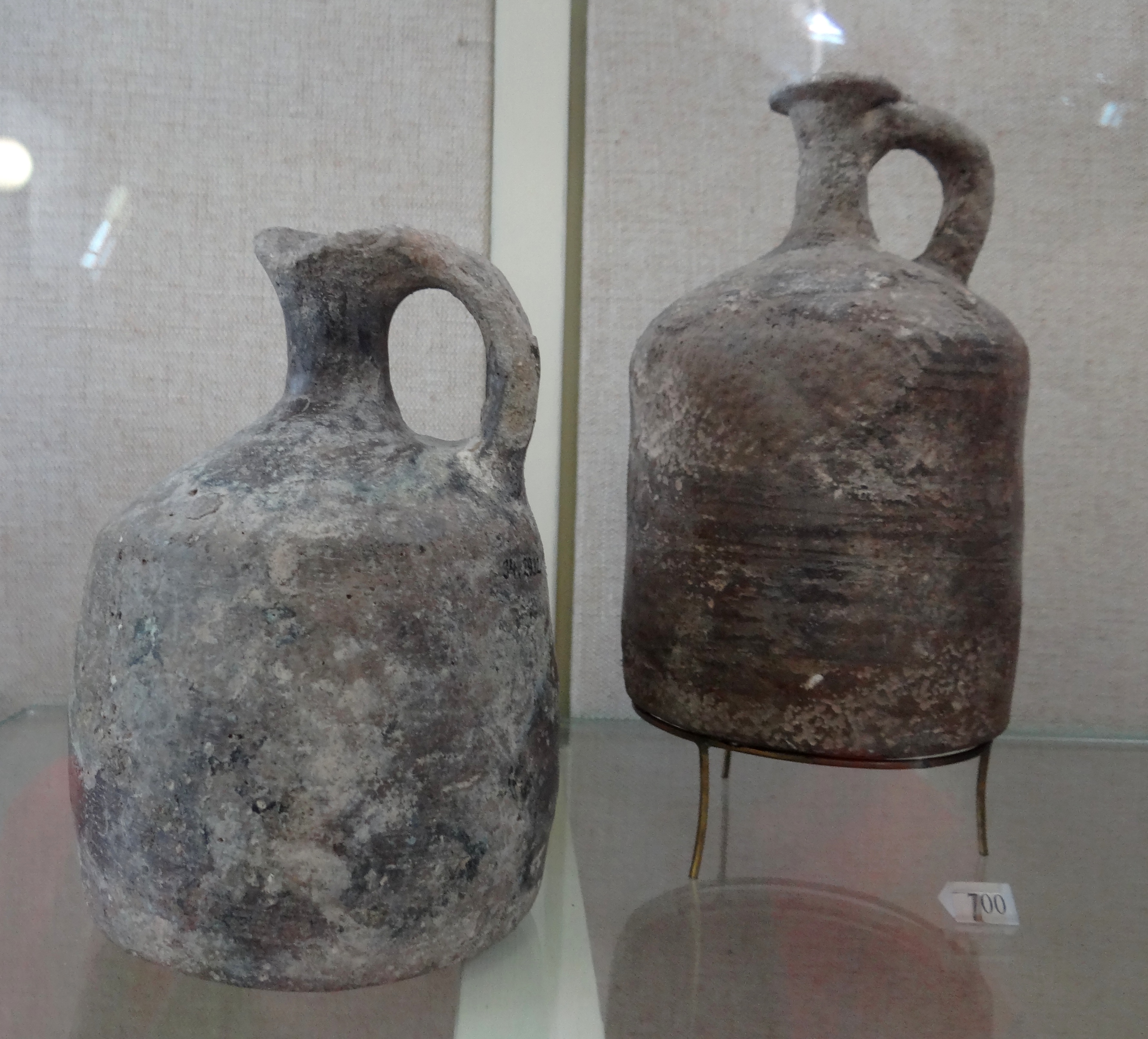
Tell el-Yehudiyeh ware juglets. Rockefeller Museum

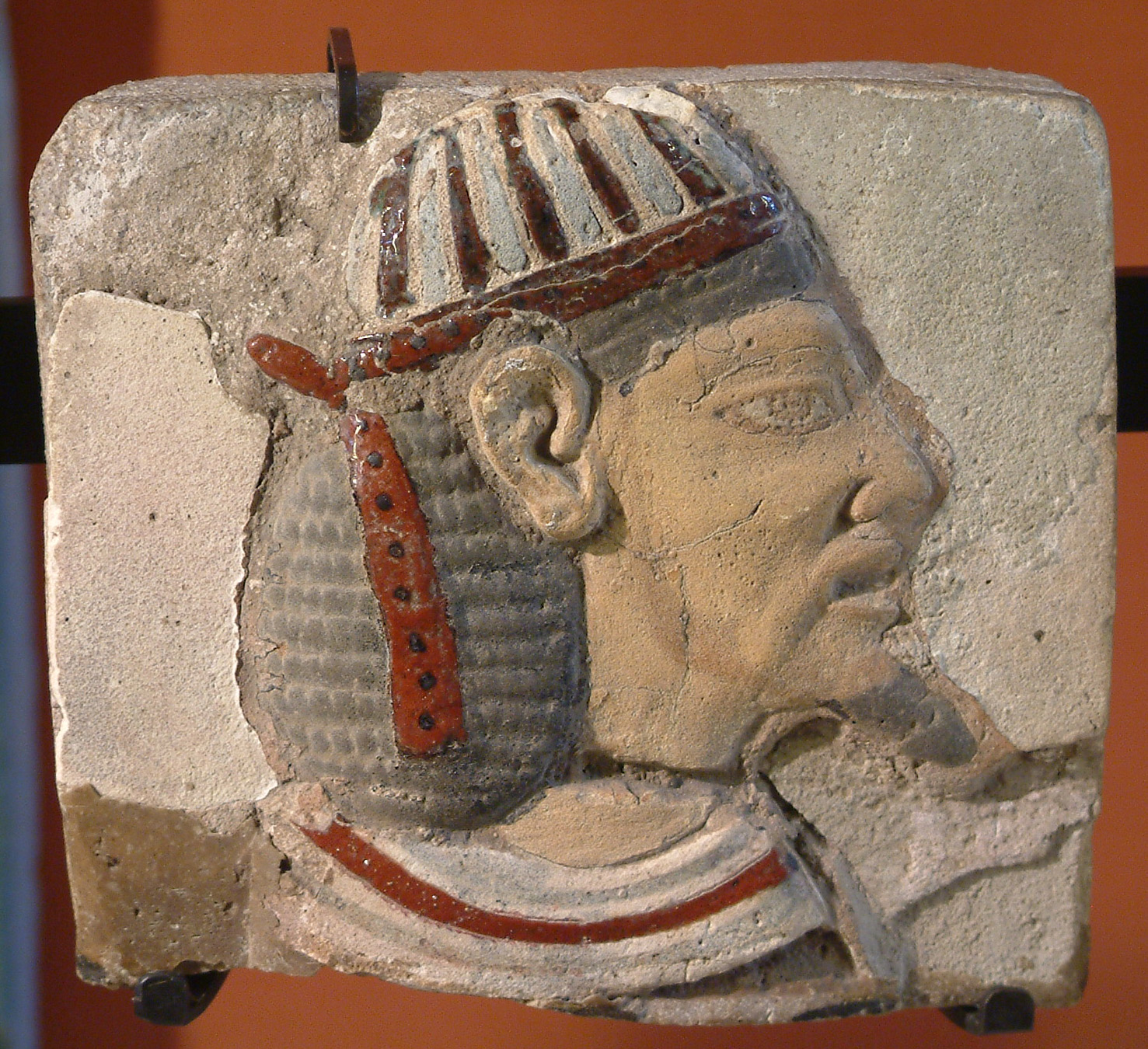
Head of an Asiatic prisoner, earthenware, fragment, Tell el-Yahoudiyeh (1184–1153 BCE), one of Ramesses III prisoner tiles

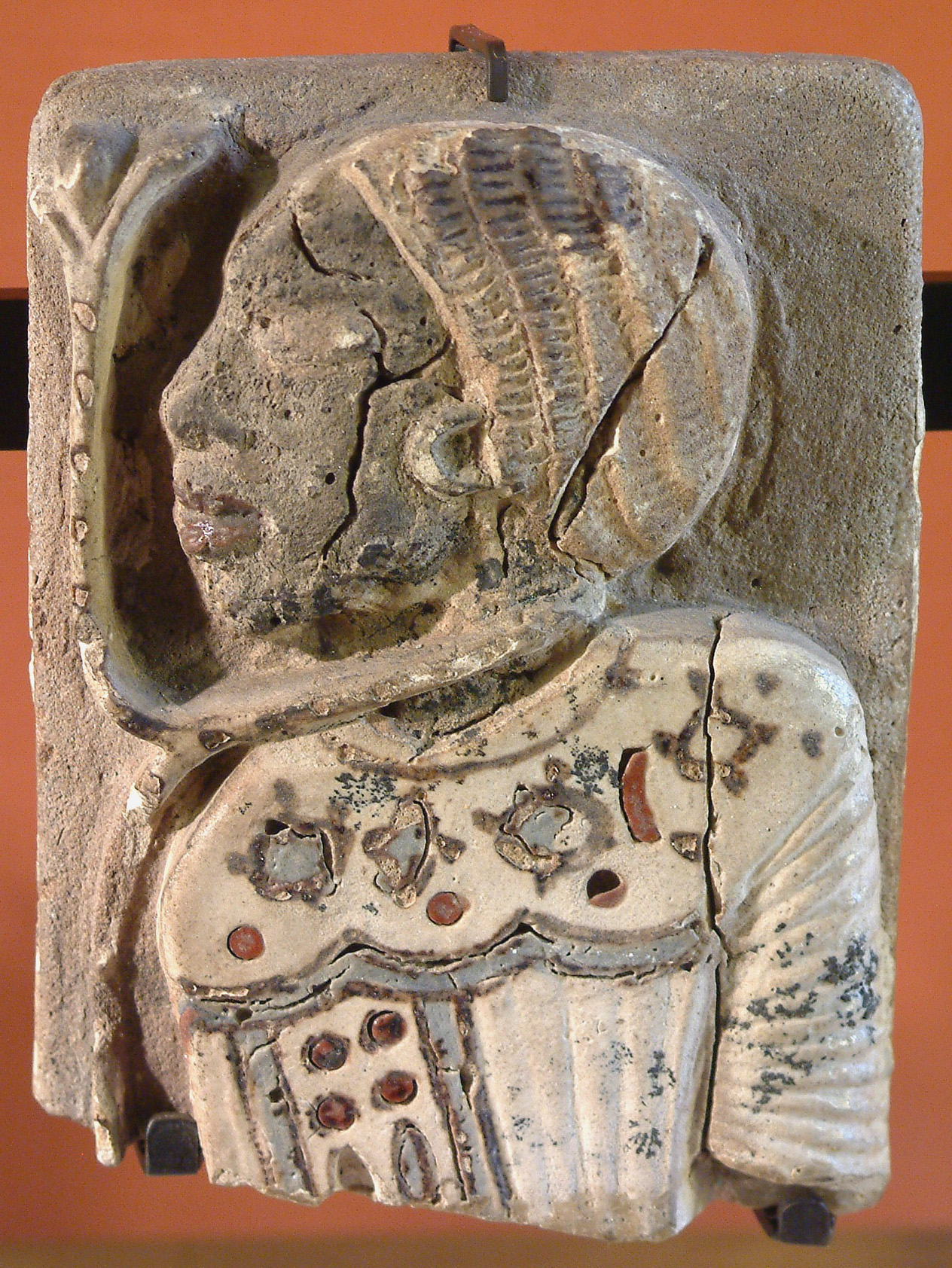
Faience decoration of an enemy. From the palace of Ramses III at Tell el-Yahudiya, Louvre, one of Ramesses III prisoner tiles

== See also ==
- Land of Onias
