= Nubian vault =

Type of vaulted structure

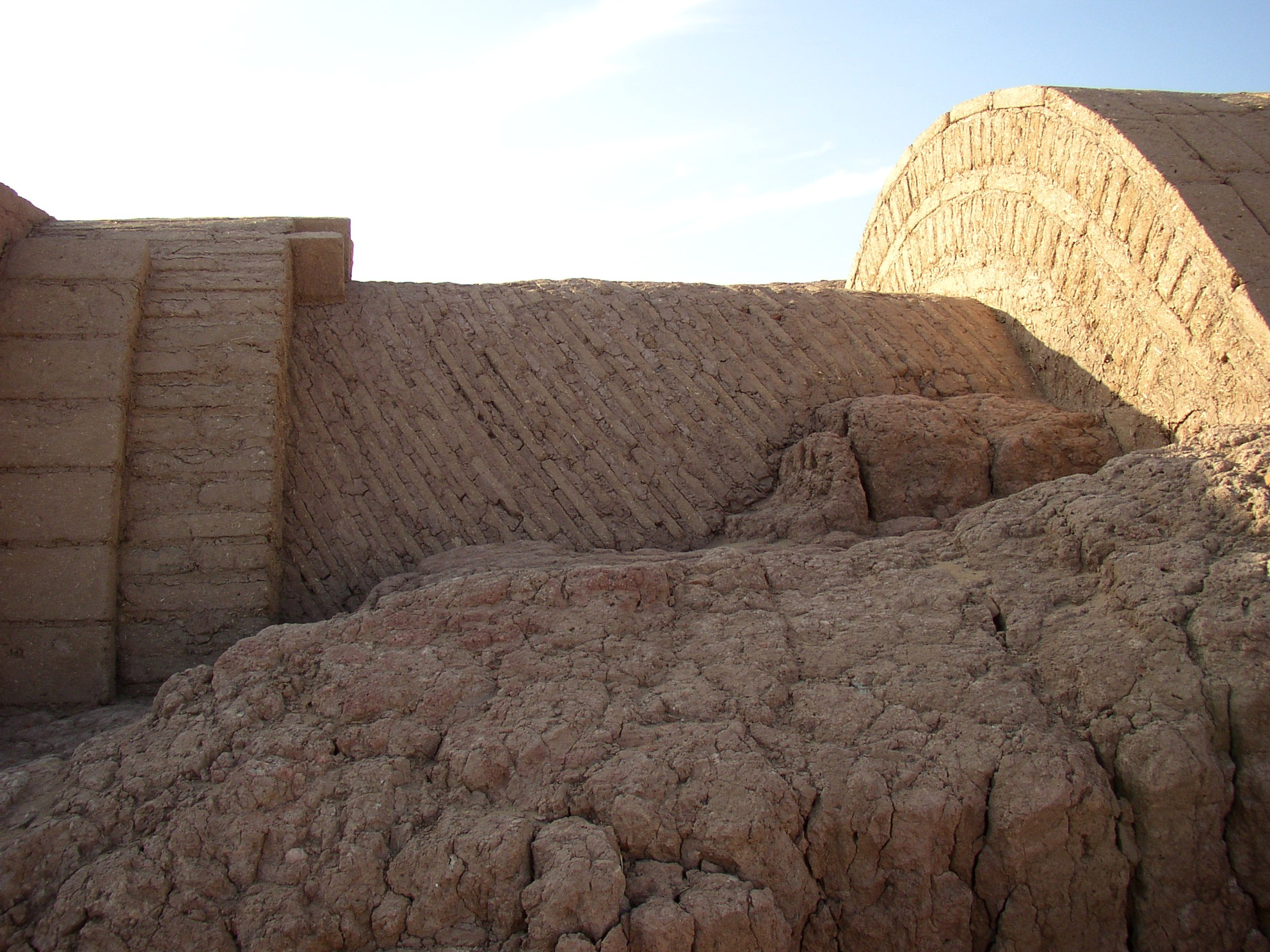
The ruins of Ayn Asil in Dakhla, Egypt

In architecture, a Nubian vault is a type of curved surface forming a vaulted structure. The mudbrick structure was revived by Egyptian architect Hassan Fathy after re-discovering the technique in the Nubian village of Abu al-Riche. The technology is advocated by environmentalists as environmentally friendly and sustainable since it makes use of pure earth without the need of timber. The technology is of Nubian origin.

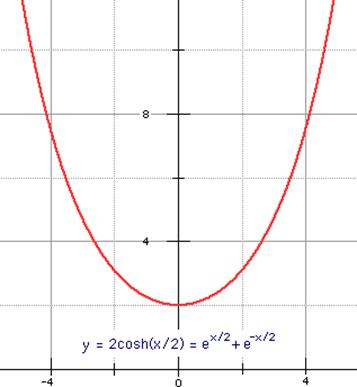
The classical definition of the contour of the Nubian vault is that obtained when a chain is held up at its two ends. The vault is more or less open or wide depending on how far apart the two chain ends are held.

One of the key advantages of the Nubian vault is that it can be built without any support or shuttering. The earth bricks are laid leaning at a slight slope against the gable walls in a length-wise vault, as in this photo of a building from the ruins of Ayn Asil in Egypt. The same principle can be used to build domes, as in the example below from Cameroon.

The age-old Nubian vault technique was notably revived by the Egyptian architect Hassan Fathy in the 1940s with the building of a new village at Gourna, near Luxor. Architecturally, this village is a singular success; however, the families who were moved there soon abandoned it to return to their original village.

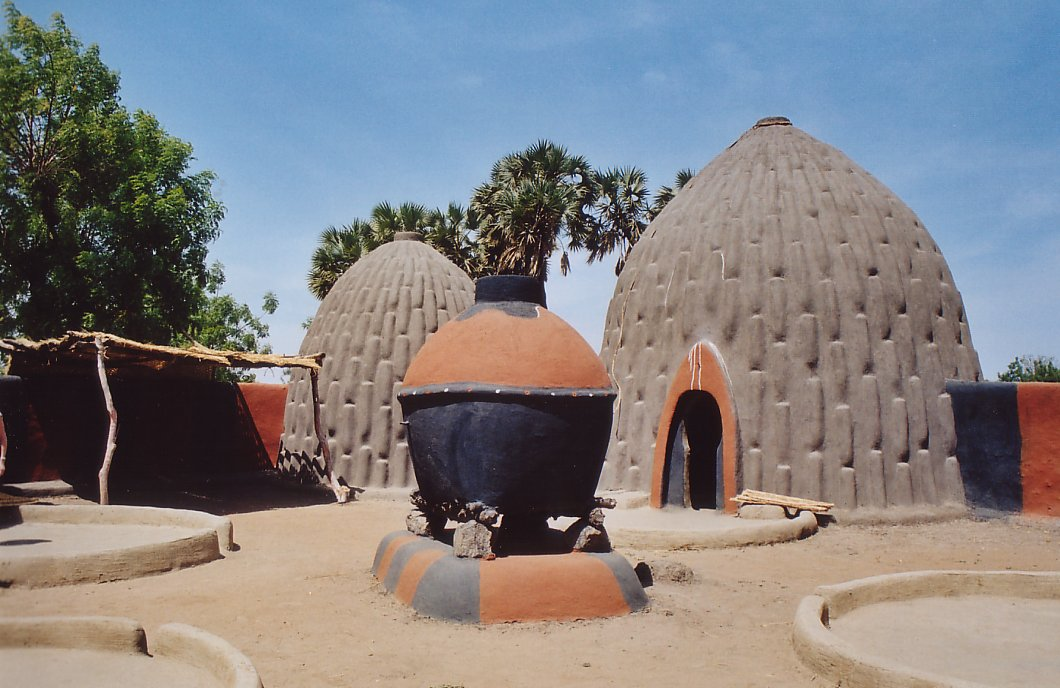
The homes of the Musgum, in the Far North Province of Cameroon

More recently, since the year 2000, a French /Burkinabé NGO La Voûte Nubienne, by simplifying and codifying the VN (Voûte Nubienne) technique, has promoted the construction of over 1600 vaulted buildings in Burkina Faso, Mali, and Senegal (mainly village homes, but also a Catholic church, several mosques, schools, literacy centres, and a dispensary). These environmentally sound, comfortable, and aesthetic buildings require neither imported sheet metal for the roofing, nor expensive and increasingly rare timber beams. Over 260 masons have been trained in the technique, and there are as many apprentices currently undergoing on-the-job training on building sites (2012). The programme organised by the Association "Earth roofs for the Sahel" is experiencing around 30% year on year growth in response to demand from rural families, with many requests for help and technical advice coming from the countries of the Sahel, and from further afield (a programme was launched in Zambia in early 2009, under the aegis of AVN-Belgium).

Recent research has adapted the construction principles of traditional Nubian vault construction to digital fabrication technologies, including 3D concrete printing. These approaches use 3D-printed concrete thin shells that act as stay-in-place formworks to cast vaulted slabs, and have been explored in both academic research projects as well as in real-world built structures.

== See also ==
- Nubian architecture
- List of architectural vaults
- Catenary arch
- Inverted catenary arch
- Taq Kasra
