= Tell el-Yahudiyeh Ware =

Type of ancient ceramic ware

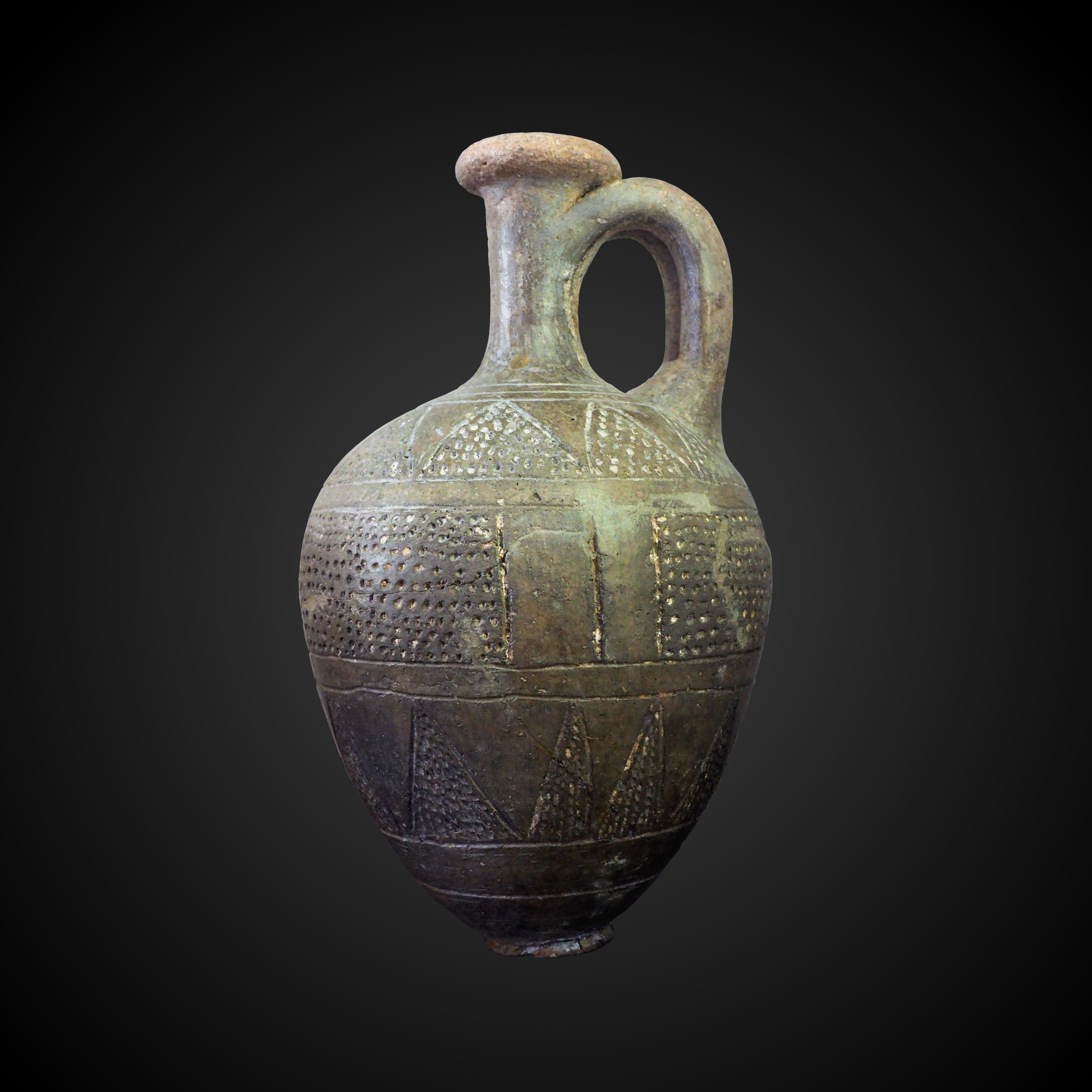
Ovoid jug featuring the ornamental engravings filled with white coating characteristic of the Tell el-Yahudiyeh Ware style. Found by Pierre Montet at Byblos necropolis in 1923, on display at the Louvre Museum.

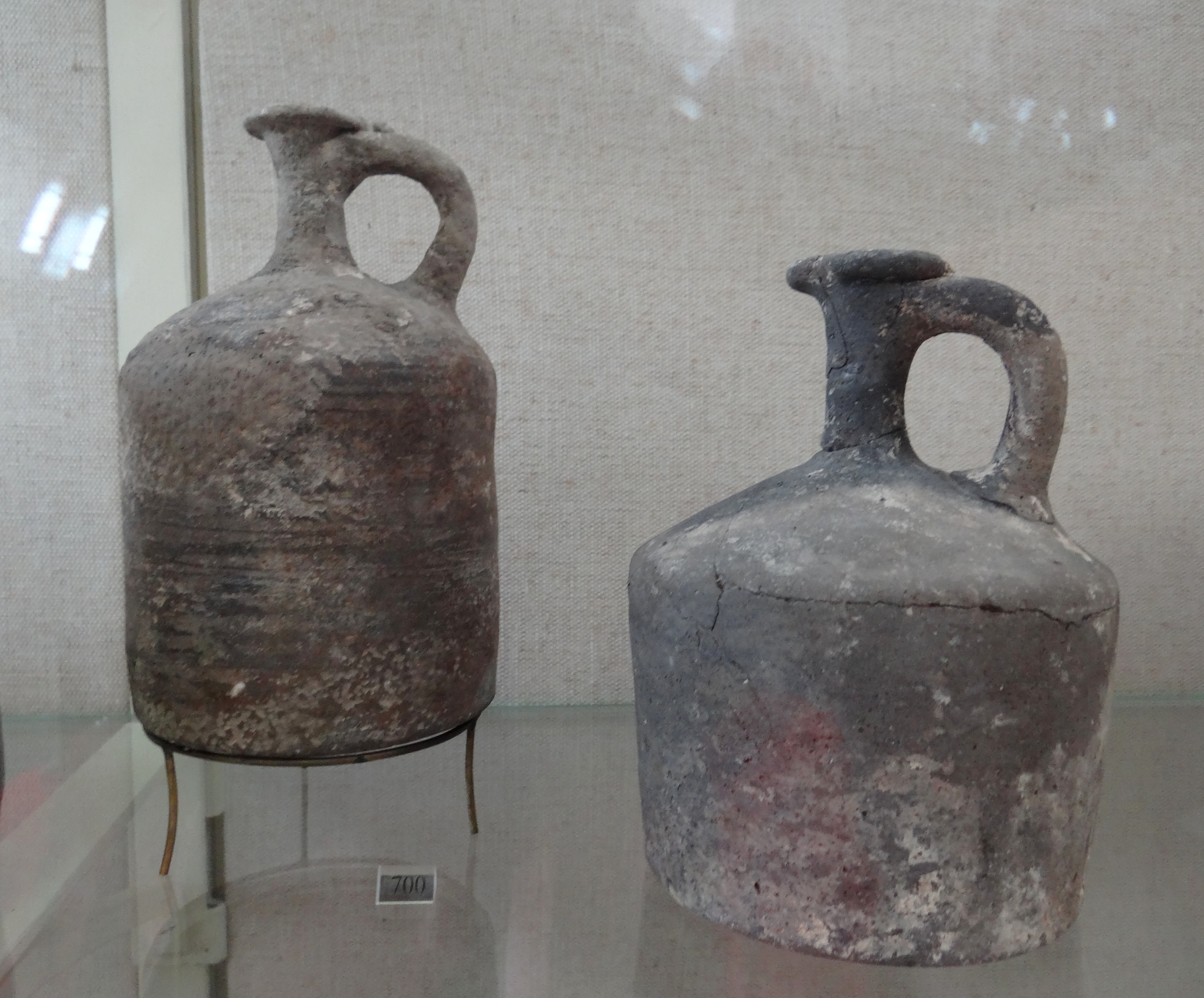
Tell el-Yahudiyeh Ware juglets. Rockefeller Museum Israel

Tell el-Yahudiyeh Ware or Tell el-Yahudiya ware (often abbreviated TEY) is a distinctive ceramic ware of the late Middle Bronze Age/Second Intermediate Period. The ware takes its name from its type site at Tell el-Yahudiyeh in the eastern Nile Delta of ancient Egypt, and is also found in a large number of Levantine and Cypriot sites. It was first recognised as a distinctive ware by Sir Flinders Petrie during his excavation of the type site.

The ware first appears in strata dating to the MBIIA period, reaching the peak of its popularity in the MBIIB-C periods when it is encountered very frequently in contemporaneous Canaanite and Delta sites. The last vestigial expressions of this ware die out during the LBI period.

Tell el-Yehudiyeh Ware forms a very useful diagnostic indicator for the MBIIB-C period especially. In the Nile delta it is often considered to mark the presence of the Hyksos invaders.

Many ceramicists see the form of the Tell el-Yehudiyeh juglet as being firmly grounded in earlier Canaanite ceramic traditions, able to be traced back to earlier prototypes such as the juglets from Tomb A at Jericho.

== Fabric and technique ==
The clay used in Tell el-Yehudiyeh Ware is normally grey or light-brown in colour, with numerous gritty inclusions.

== Decoration ==
Tell el-Yehudiyeh Ware is characterised by its distinctive mode of decoration, applied after slipping and burnishing, and created by repeatedly "pricking" the surface of the vessel with a small sharp object to create a large variety of geometric designs ('puncturing' according to some writers—not a completely accurate description of the process, as it appears to have been the potters' intention not to 'puncture' or 'pierce' the vessel wall, but merely to make a series of small impressions or dents). These designs appear in the form of lines, stripes, triangles, squares and—very occasionally—circles. Vessels of Tell el-Yehudiyeh Ware frequently have a dark surface (the burnished slip varying from brownish black, to grey, to yellowish), the multiple holes often being filled with chalk or lime, the contrasting white material making the surface design even more dramatic.

== Morphology ==
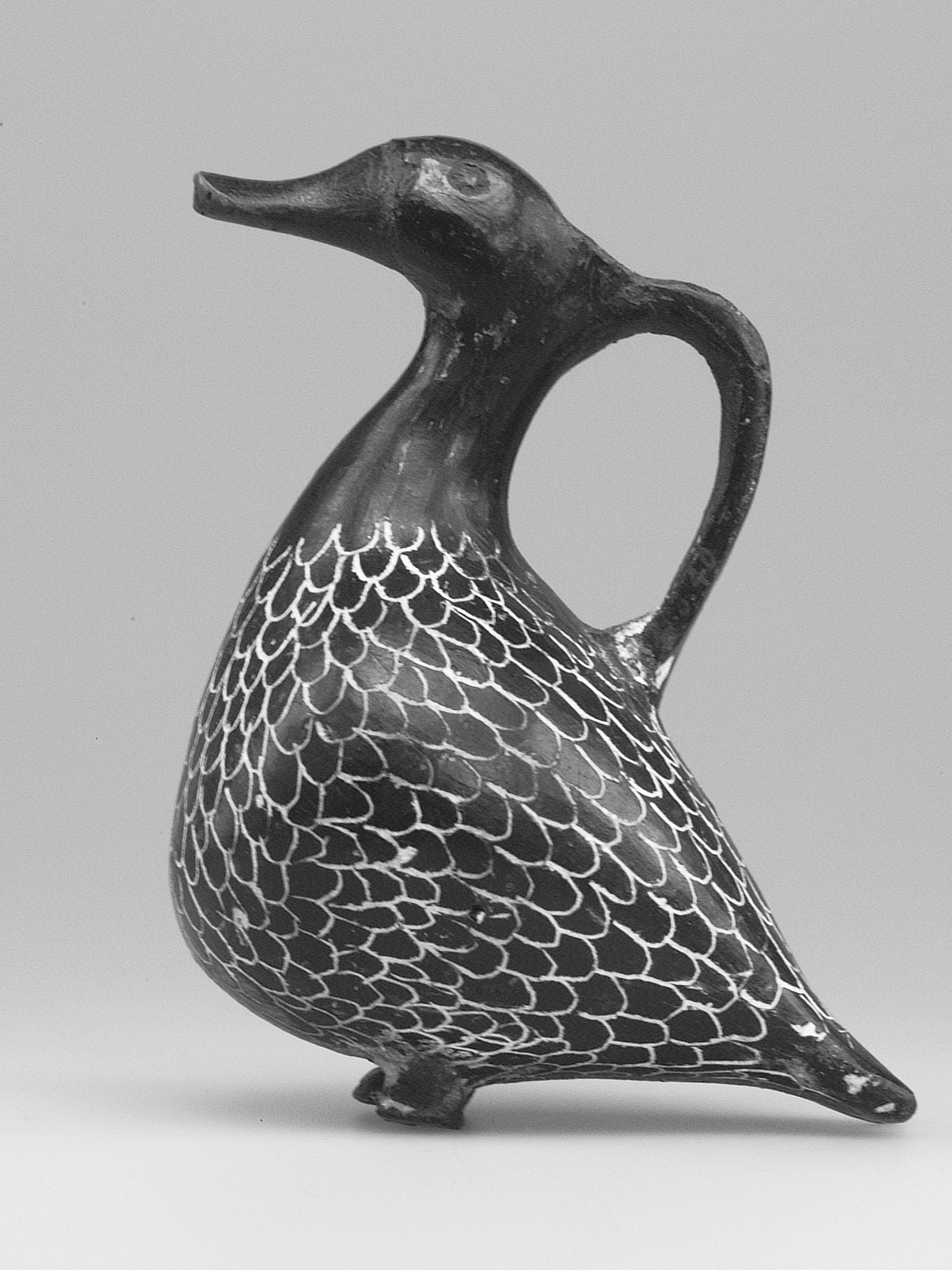
Zoomorphic vase in shape of a duck, Thebes, Deir el-Bahri, Tomb of Iuy. c. 1700 BC

Tell el-Yehudiyeh Ware is primarily seen in the form of juglets, but also includes a large variety of zoomorphic (animal-shaped) vessels and even some shaped like fruit.

== Distribution ==
Well represented in the Nile Valley up into Nubia (though primarily in the eastern Nile Delta of Egypt), the southern portion of Canaan, the north coast of Canaan, the Phoenician and Syrian coasts and the island of Cyprus (primarily the eastern regions). Not presently found in inland Syria.

== See also ==
- Ascalon/Tel Ashkelon, where such ware was produced and used for dating purposes
