= Faras Gallery at the National Museum in Warsaw =

Coordinates: 52°13′54″N 21°1′29″E

Faras Gallery at the National Museum, Warsaw
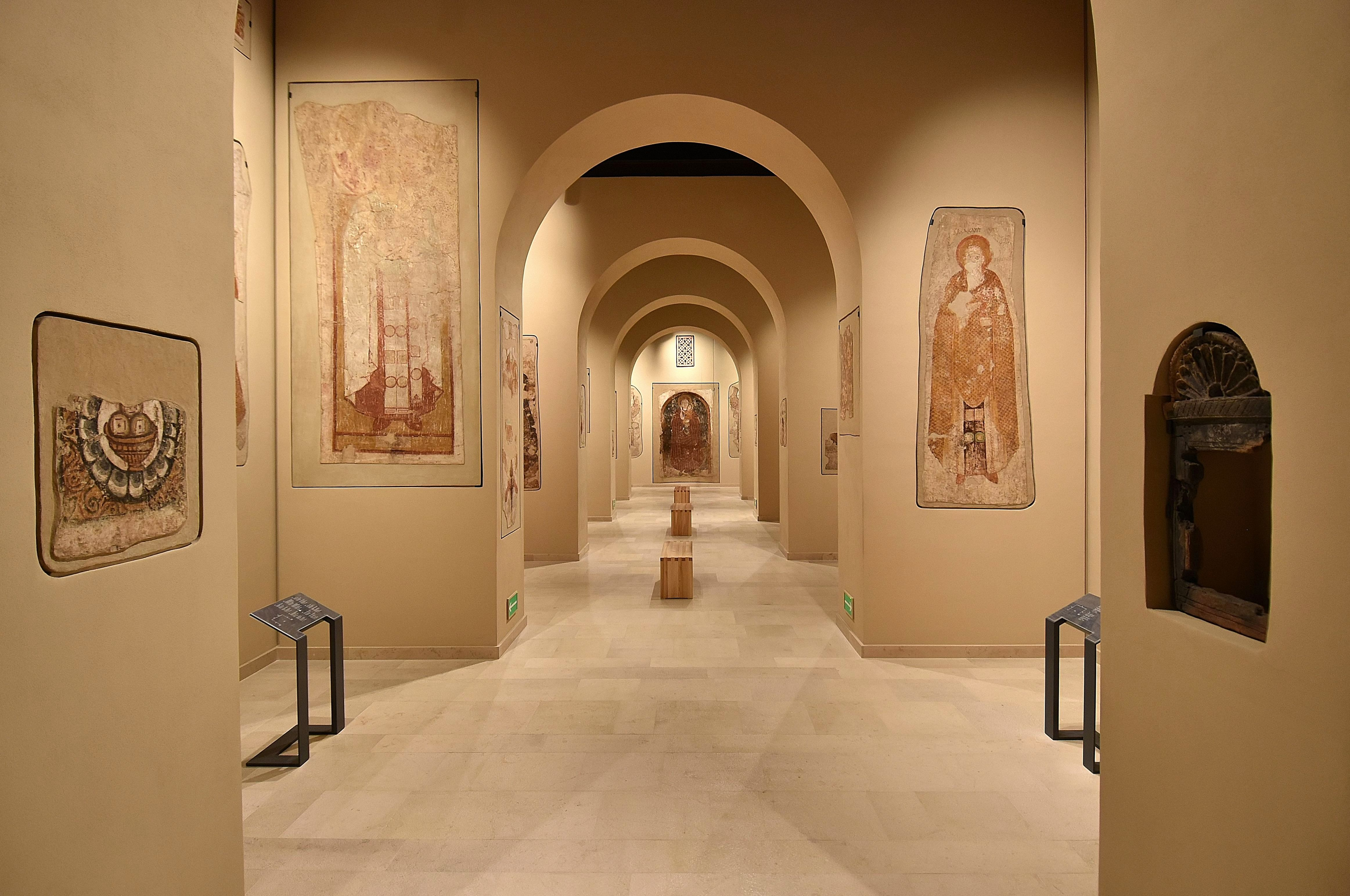
- Established: 1972
- Location: Aleje Jerozolimskie, Warsaw, Poland
- Type: Gallery
- Collections: Early Christian art, Archaeology

The Professor Kazimierz Michałowski Faras Gallery at the National Museum in Warsaw is a permanent gallery at the National Museum in Warsaw, presenting Nubian early Christian art. The Gallery features a unique collection of wall paintings and architectural elements from the Faras Cathedral, discovered by an archaeological expedition led by Professor Kazimierz Michałowski.

== History of the gallery ==
=== Excavations at Faras ===
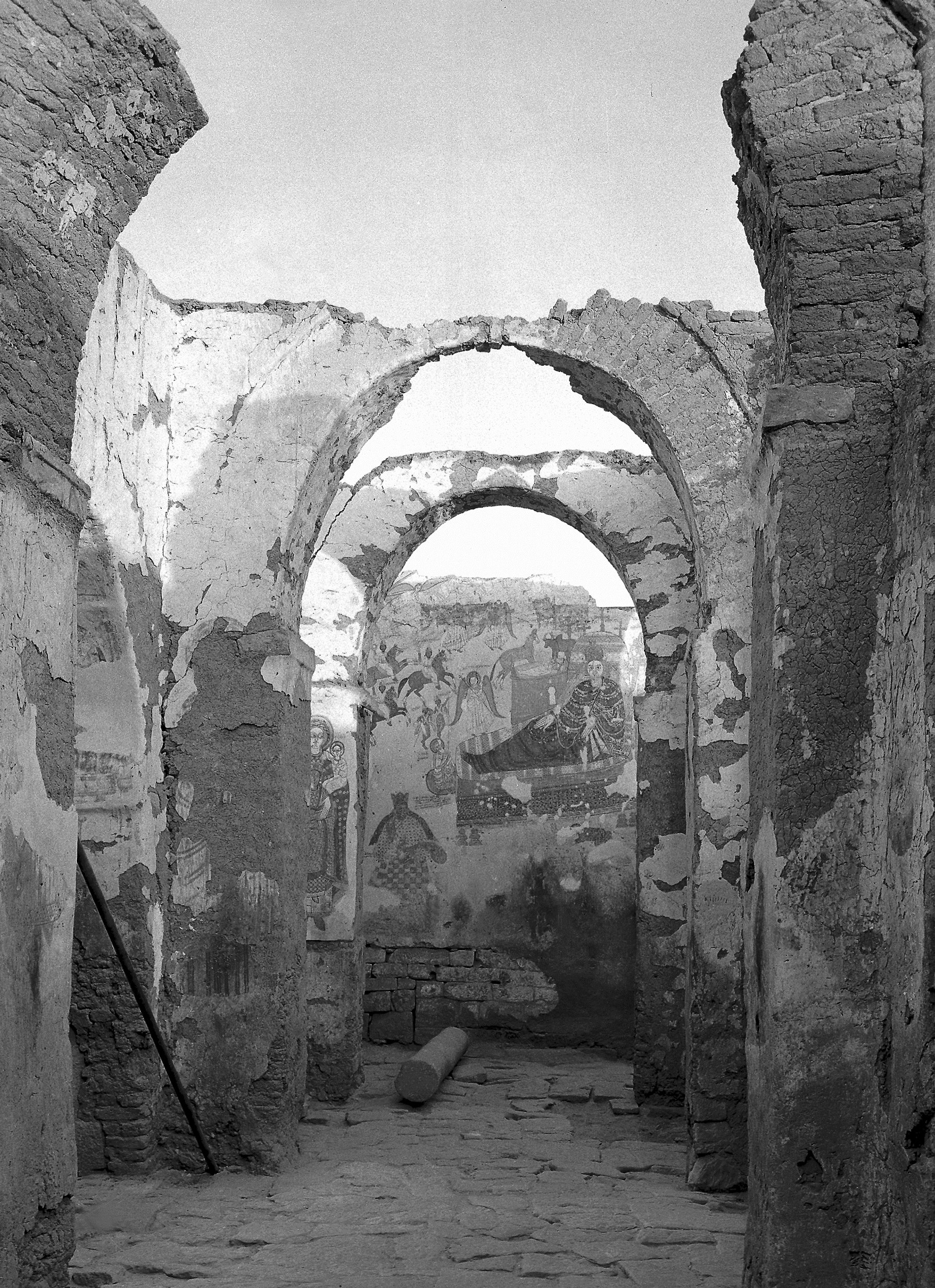
Excavations at Faras – wall painting on site

Most of the artworks shown in the Faras Gallery found their way there thanks to the archaeologists participating in the international effort to save the remains of old Nile basin cultures, known as the Nubian Campaign. The Nubian Campaign was initiated by UNESCO in 1959 (official inauguration took place on March 8, 1960). Excavations in Faras, which lasted between 1961 and 1964 were directed by Professor Kazimierz Michałowski on behalf of the Polish Centre of Mediterranean Archaeology of the University of Warsaw (then the Polish Centre of Mediterranean Archaeology of the University of Warsaw in Cairo). During the excavations the archaeologists discovered well-preserved ruins of places of worship, layered one over another, within the area of the city Faras (ancient Pachoras), next to the Sudanese-Egyptian border. The buildings originated from between the 7th and 14th centuries, and were decorated with wall paintings depicting Christian religious themes.

=== Removal of the wall paintings ===
In order to remove the wall paintings from the cathedral walls and move them to specially prepared screens, it was necessary to secure and reinforce the surface to prevent cracking. To do this, the faces of paintings were covered with sheets of japanese tissue paper and impregnated with a thick mix of wax-rosin. Upper parts of the paintings were secured by pressing stripes of canvas into them. Next, fragments of plaster with the paintings attached to them were cut off from walls using knives and saws. The removed paintings were then moved onto wooden screens. It was necessary to remove excess plaster from the backs of paintings and to reinforce the paintings with gypsum. The artworks were wrapped in cotton blankets and transported to museums in Warsaw and Khartoum. There they underwent a complex restoration process and were prepared for exhibition. The protective layers were then removed, original plaster was removed from the reverse sides of paintings, and a thin (ca. 2–3 mm) layer was moved to an artificial background.

=== Transporting the artworks ===
67 paintings and many other objects discovered in Faras have been transported to Poland. The first group of artworks arrived at the Museum in 1962. The collection held by the National Museum in Warsaw is the largest and most valuable set of archaeological heritage found outside Poland residing in Polish museum collections.

=== Other discoveries ===
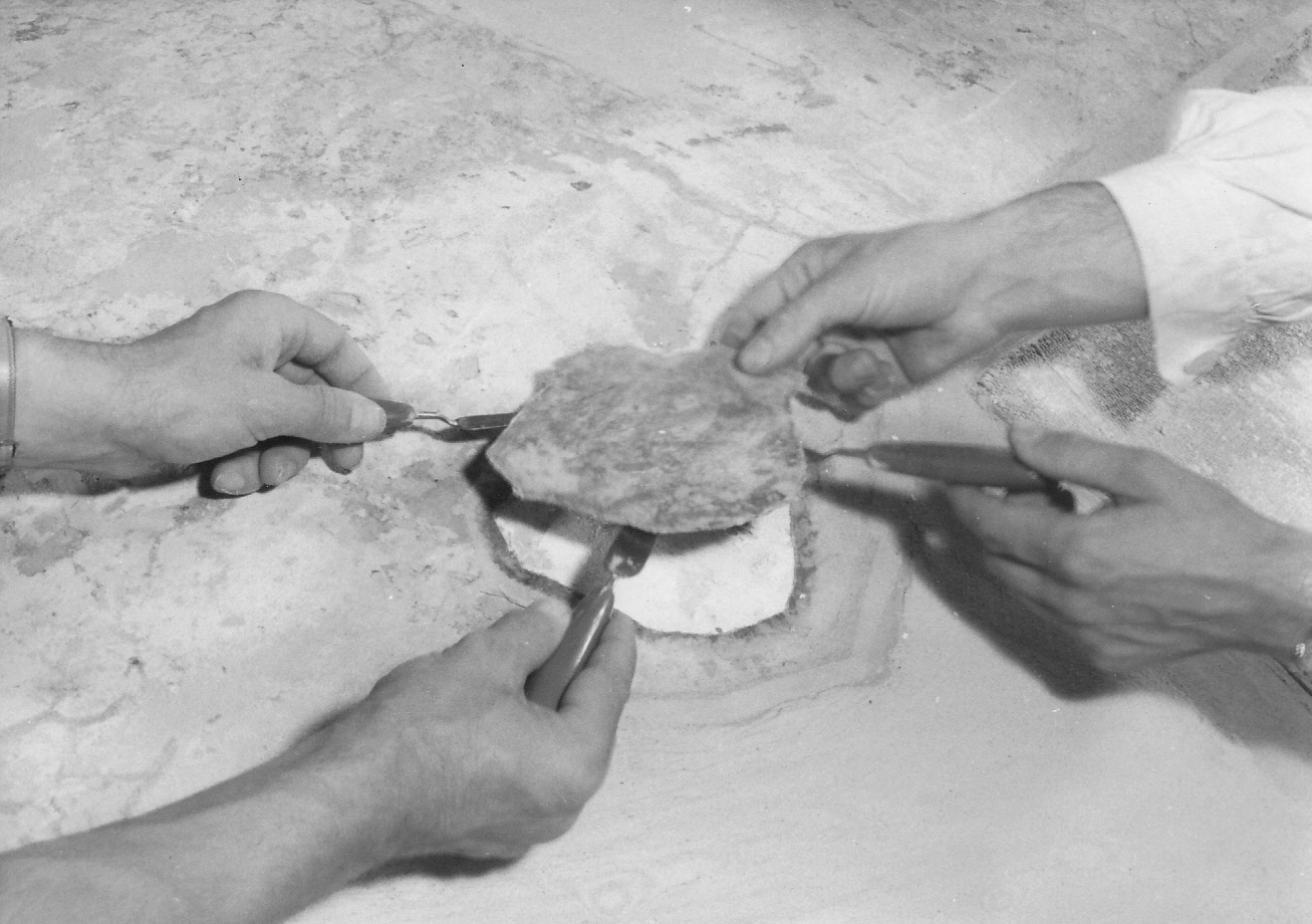
Restoration works at the National Museum in Warsaw, mid-1960s

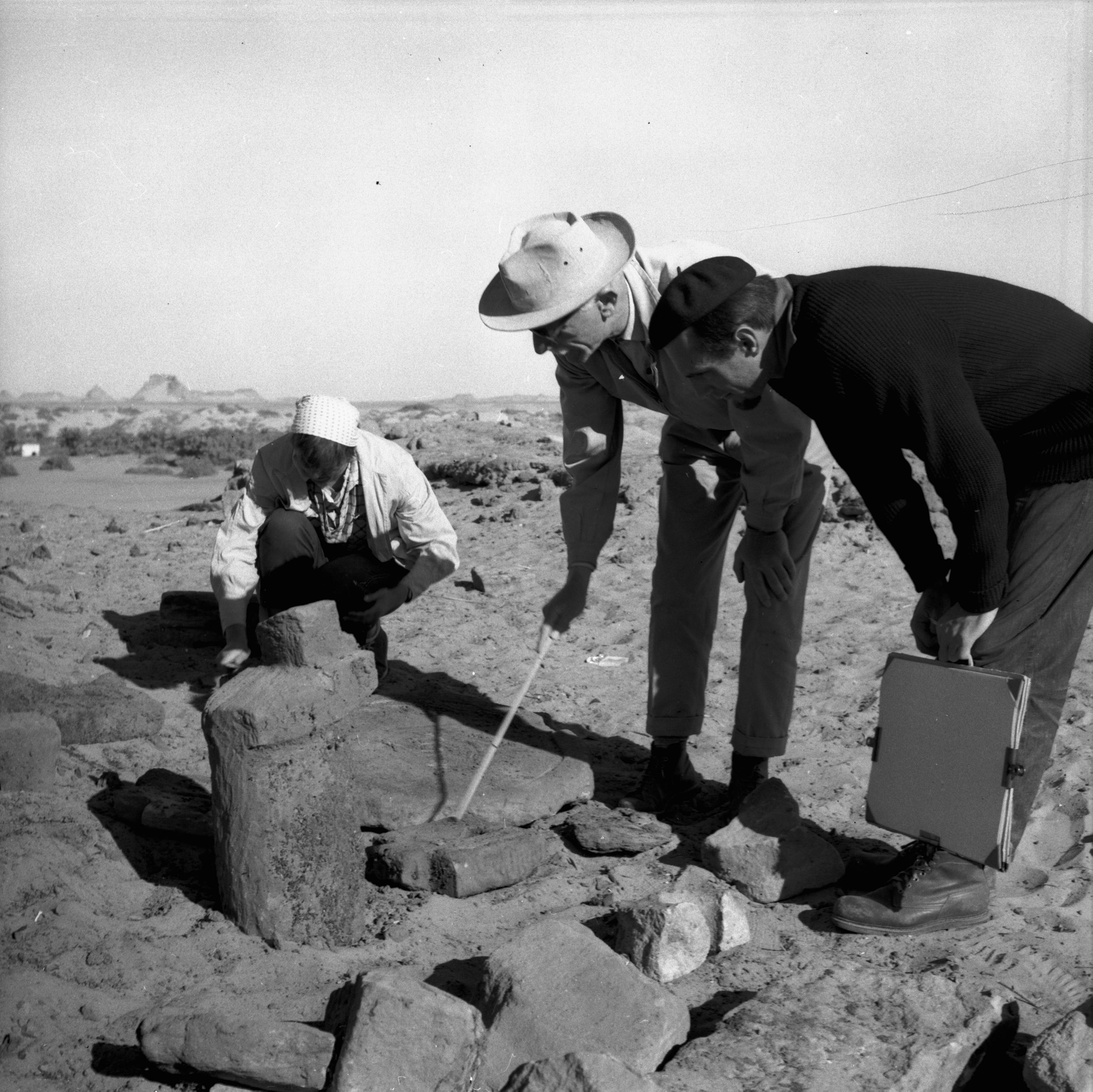
Excavations at Faras

The Nubian Campaign generated scientific interest in Sudan and its ancient cultures. Polish archaeologists have conducted numerous excavations and research expeditions in Old Dongola, the capital of Makuria, Banganarti or the IVth region of Nile cataract. These expeditions considerably expanded the original collection of the Faras Gallery.

=== The opening of Faras Gallery ===
The Faras Gallery at the National Museum in Warsaw was opened to the public in 1972, and accompanied by the first nubiology congress and the announcement of a new scientific discipline: nubiology.

=== The rearrangement of the Gallery in 2014 ===
On 17 October 2014 the renovated and rearranged Faras Gallery was reopened. The authors of the architectural design and modernised concept of the gallery space are Mirosław Orzechowski and Grzegorz Rytel. The exhibition is curated by Bożena Mierzejewska. The modernisation was funded by Wojciech Pawłowski. The Faras Gallery was reopened under the auspices of UNESCO and the Minister of Culture and National Heritage Małgorzata Omilanowska.

== Exhibition ==
=== Room I: The First Cathedral at Faras ===
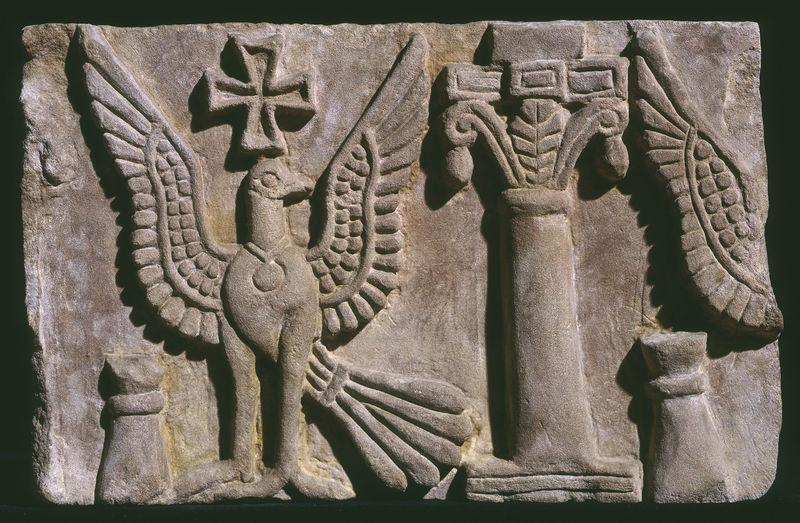
Frieze block from the First Cathedral, Room I

Room I presents objects found at the Faras Cathedral, such as the frieze fragment from the apse of the First Cathedral; the founding inscription of bishop Paulos (commemorating the renovation of the cathedral in 707 AD, "a holy Catholic place and a church of the Apostles of God"), stone blocks with inscriptions, and other elements. These objects are directly related to the history of the cathedral and its numerous building stages, happening from the 7th until the 14th century. The cathedral was built on the foundations of an older church, built in the beginning of the 7th century AD.

=== Rooms II and III: multimedia space ===
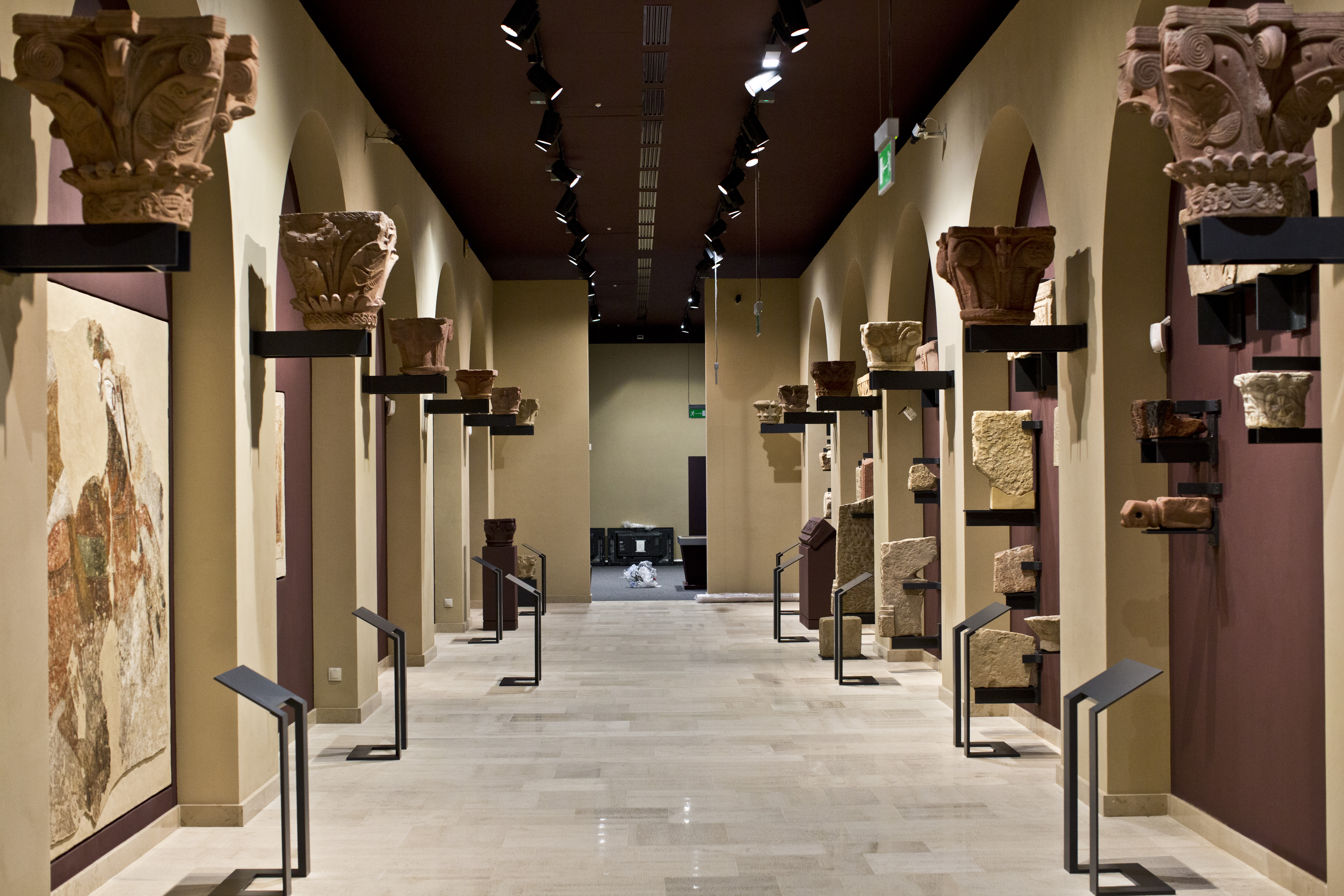
Faras Gallery Room IV

In rooms II and III the visitors can view films on the history of discoveries, Nubia and the Nubian Campaign, as well as individual paintings, their style and iconography. Also shown are the photographs of the archaeological campaigns and the photographs of artworks which were transferred to the National Museum of Sudan. Another presentation concerns professor Kazimierz Michałowski, the archaeologist who discovered the Faras Cathedral, and the patron of the gallery.

=== Room V: objects related to burial customs ===
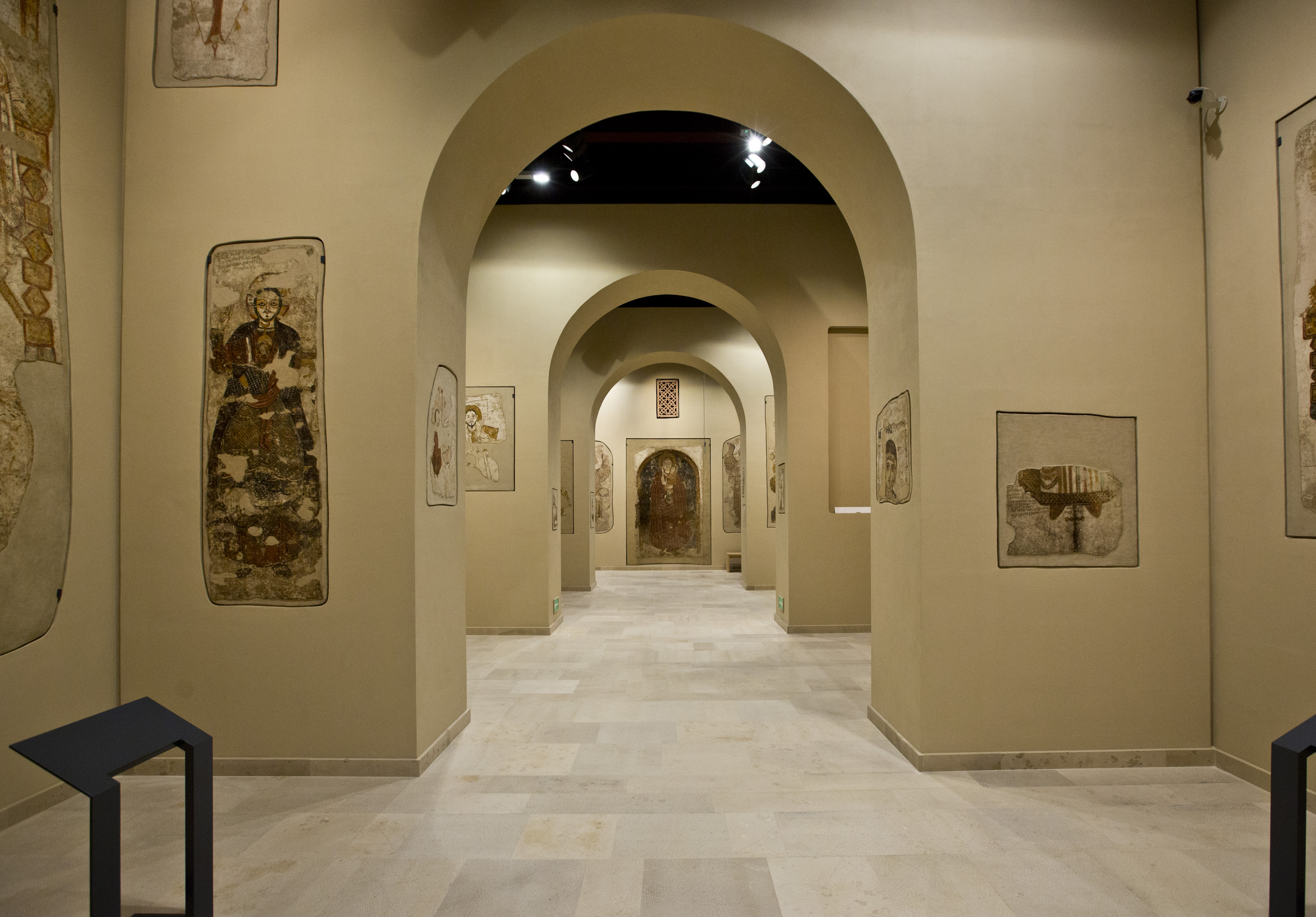
Faras Gallery Room VI

This room contains the objects related to the burial of Faras bishops. Most of the objects were found in the burial chambers or grave constructions. The objects include epitaphs, water containers or chest crosses, which were buried with the bishops.

Sixteen bishops of Faras had been buried in the close vicinity of the cathedral or inside it. Information about their identity was provided by the texts of epitaphs written in Greek or Coptic. Many epitaphs feature texts of prayers for the bishops. In Room V there are numerous examples of these epitaphs, including the epitaph of Bishop Ignatios, Bishop Maththaios, and Bishop Stephanos.

=== Room VI: the Cathedral ===
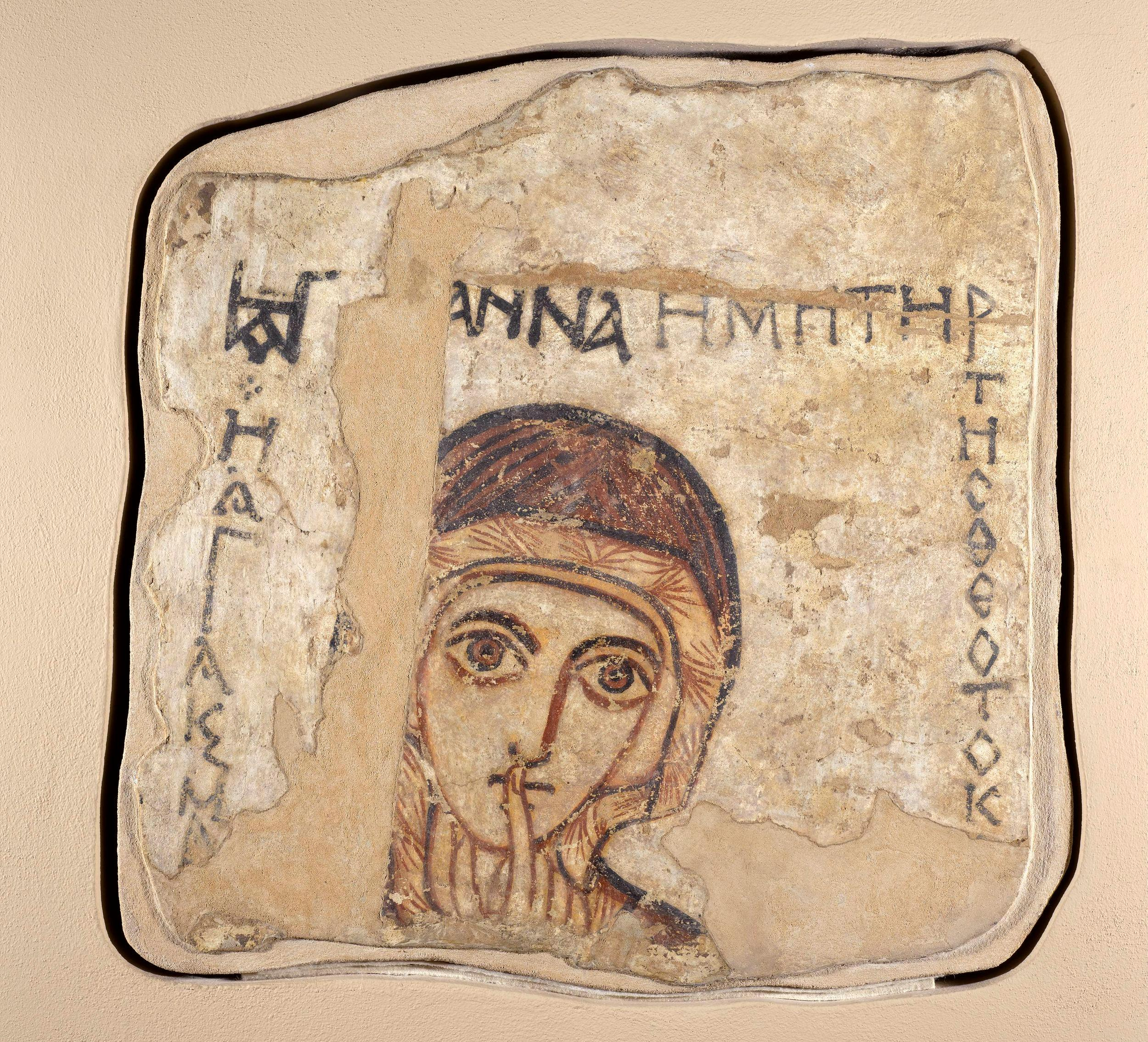
Saint Anne - wall painting presented in room VI

Room VI is designed to evoke the character of a temple, with arcades forming subsequent annexes in which the wall paintings are presented. The spatial arrangement is similar to that of the Faras Cathedral. The arcades are complemented by an apse. This room contains wall paintings removed from the walls of the nartex, northern nave and presbytery. The paintings have been created between the 7th and 14th centuries and were found on various layers of plaster (due to multiple stages of building of the cathedral and covering the walls with newer images). The wall paintings are images of Christ, Mary, angels and archangels, saints, bishops and rulers. They are painted al secco.

Among the most characteristic paintings presented in this room are: Saint Anne, Archangels Michael and Gabriel, bishops Marianos and Petros, various iconographic representations of Mary, and others.

=== Room VIII: objects from Nubia and Christian Egypt ===
Ceramics and pottery frequently constitute a majority of archaeological finds at excavation sites. The majority of finds in the case of the Faras expedition dates from the Christian period. In that time (650–1000 AD) Faras was the most important manufacturing centre for ceramics in northern Nubia. This activity came to a halt in the 10th century.

The gallery presents also Coptic ceramics as well as ceramics from earlier periods. All the items originate from Faras and the IVth Nile cataract.

Another collection is that of Coptic textiles, originating from Christian-era Egypt. This collection arrived at the National Museum in Warsaw in the 19th century and the beginning of the 20th century thanks to antiquarians and private collectors.

=== Presentations of Faras art from the National Museum in Warsaw collection outside the Faras Gallery ===
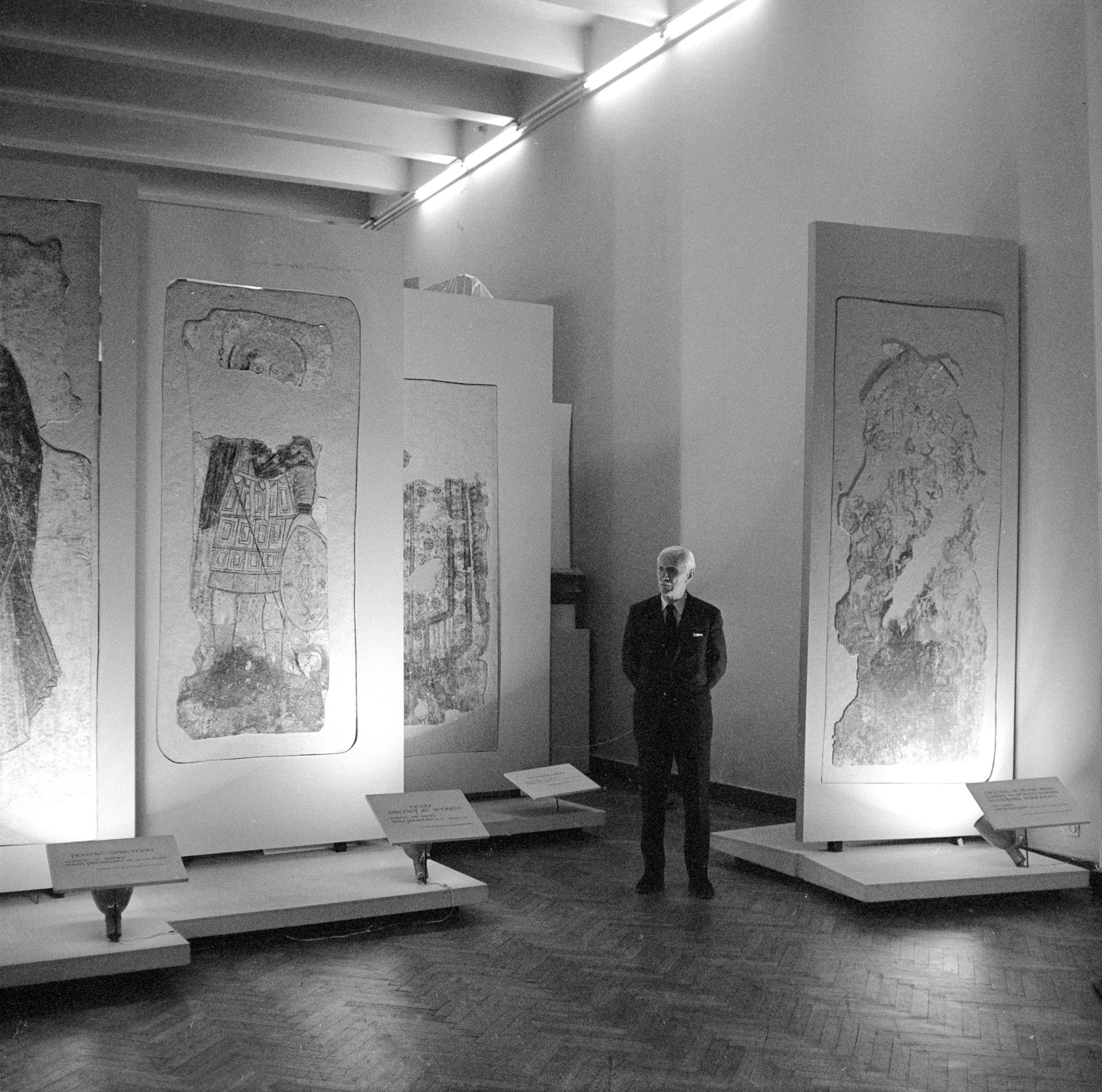
Professor Kazimierz Michałowski with the restored wall paintings, 1960s

==== Deposits ====
The Louvre contains several artworks from Faras, belonging to the National Museum in Warsaw. Among these is the image of Archangel Michael and a Faras archbishop.

==== Exhibitions ====
- December 1962: An exhibition of arts from Faras in Warsaw, presenting, among others, the wall paintings Archangel Michael and Saint Mercurius;
- 3 May – 15 August 1963: International exhibition of Coptic art in Villa Hügel, Essen, then Kunsthaus Zürich, Vienna (Museum für Völkerkunde) and *Paris (Petit Palais), and finally presented in the main hall at UNESCO in Paris (a presentation of the results of the Nubian Campaign);
- October 1967: Exhibition of the treasures from Faras at the National Museum in Warsaw presenting 40 wall paintings;
- 1968–1969: a traveling exhibit entitled "Treasures of Faras” – Berlin, Essen, Hague, Zurich, Vienna
- 2002: Faras. Die Kathedrale aus dem Wüstensand, Kunsthistorisches Museum, Vienna.

== Collection highlights ==
Murals
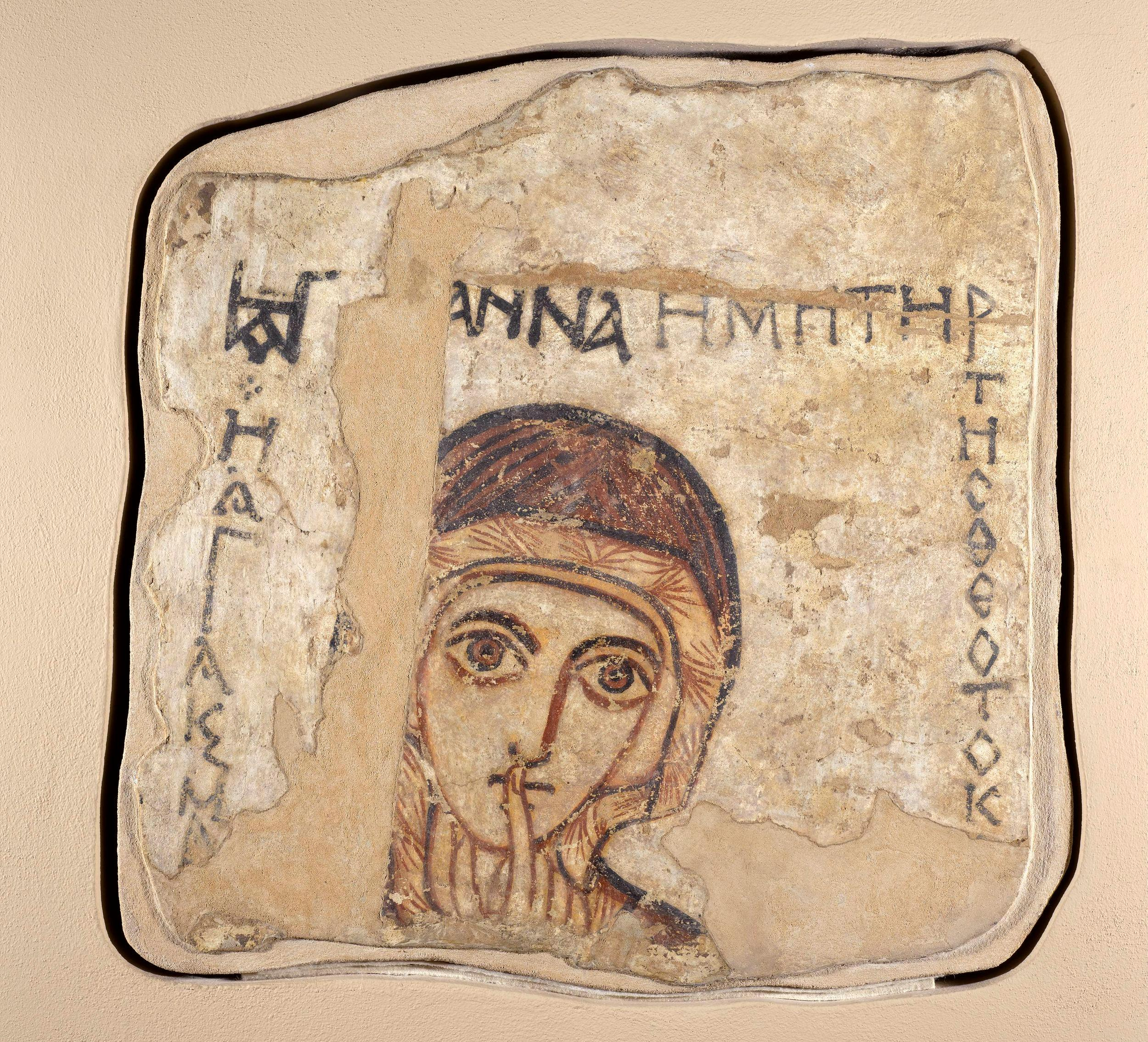
Saint Anne

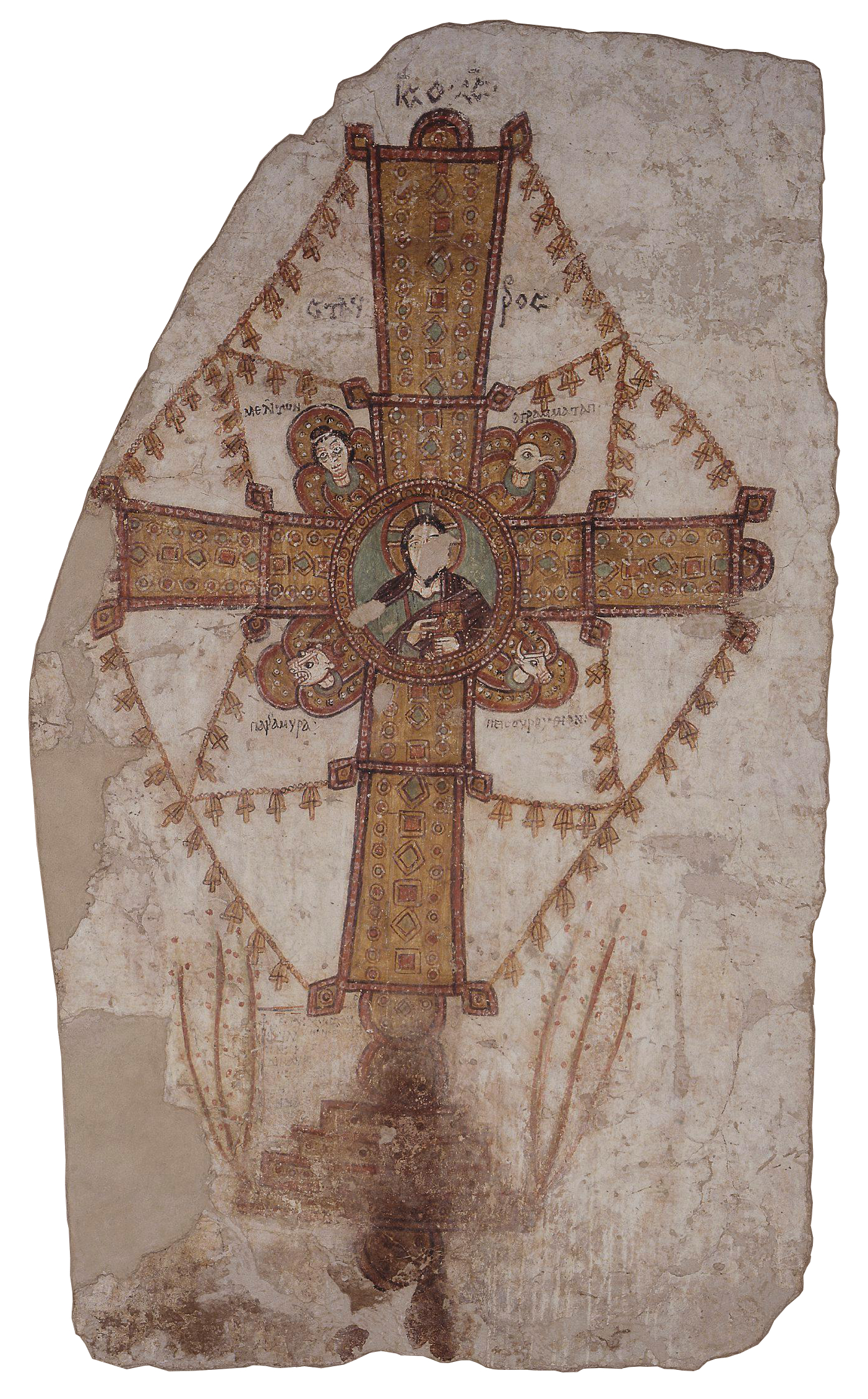
Maiestas Crucis

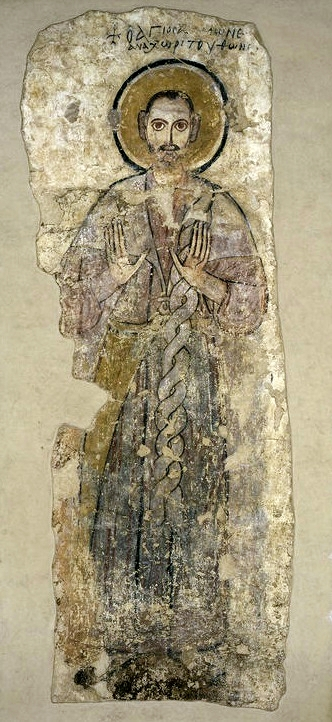
The Hermit Ammonios

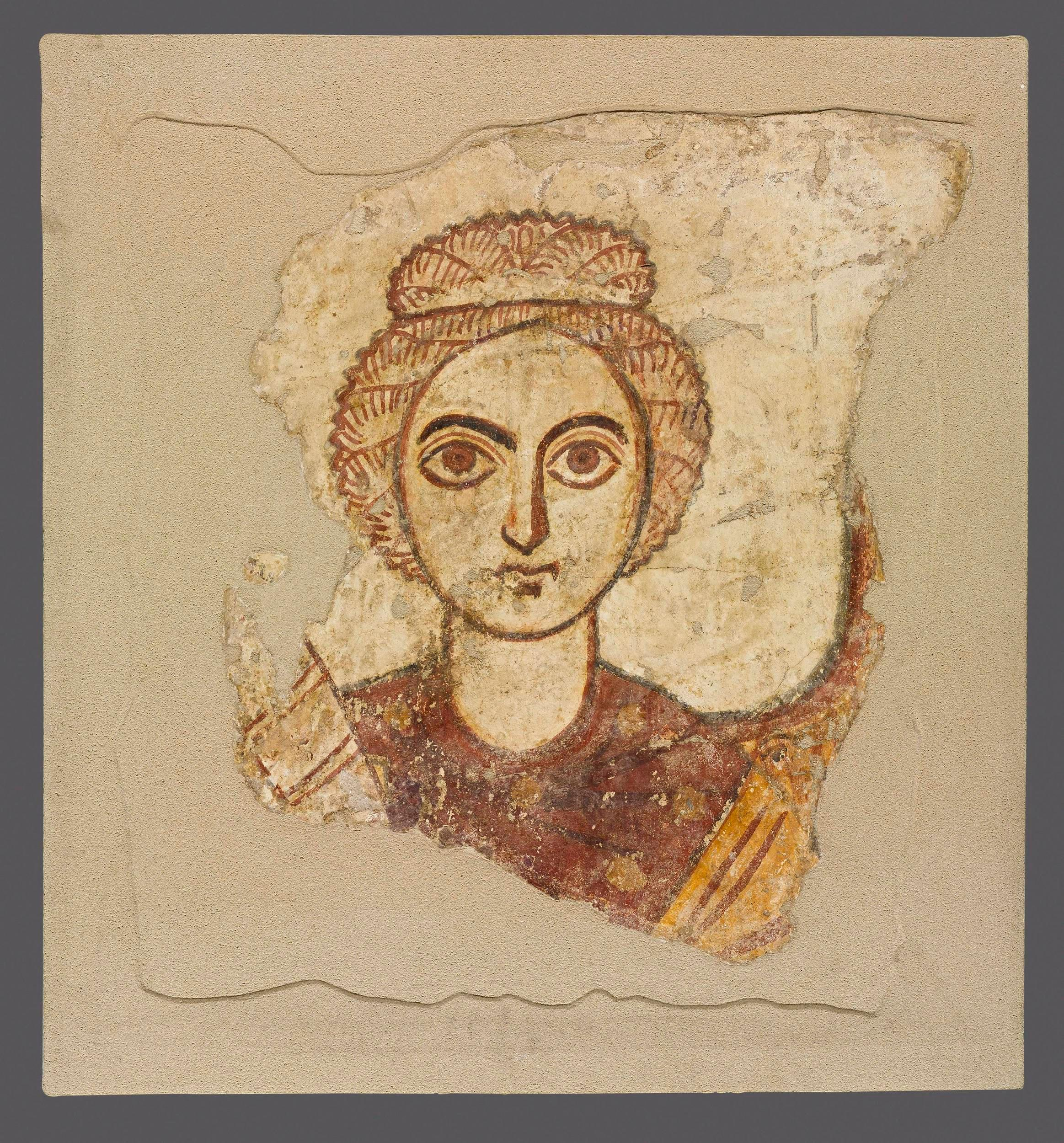
Archangel Michael

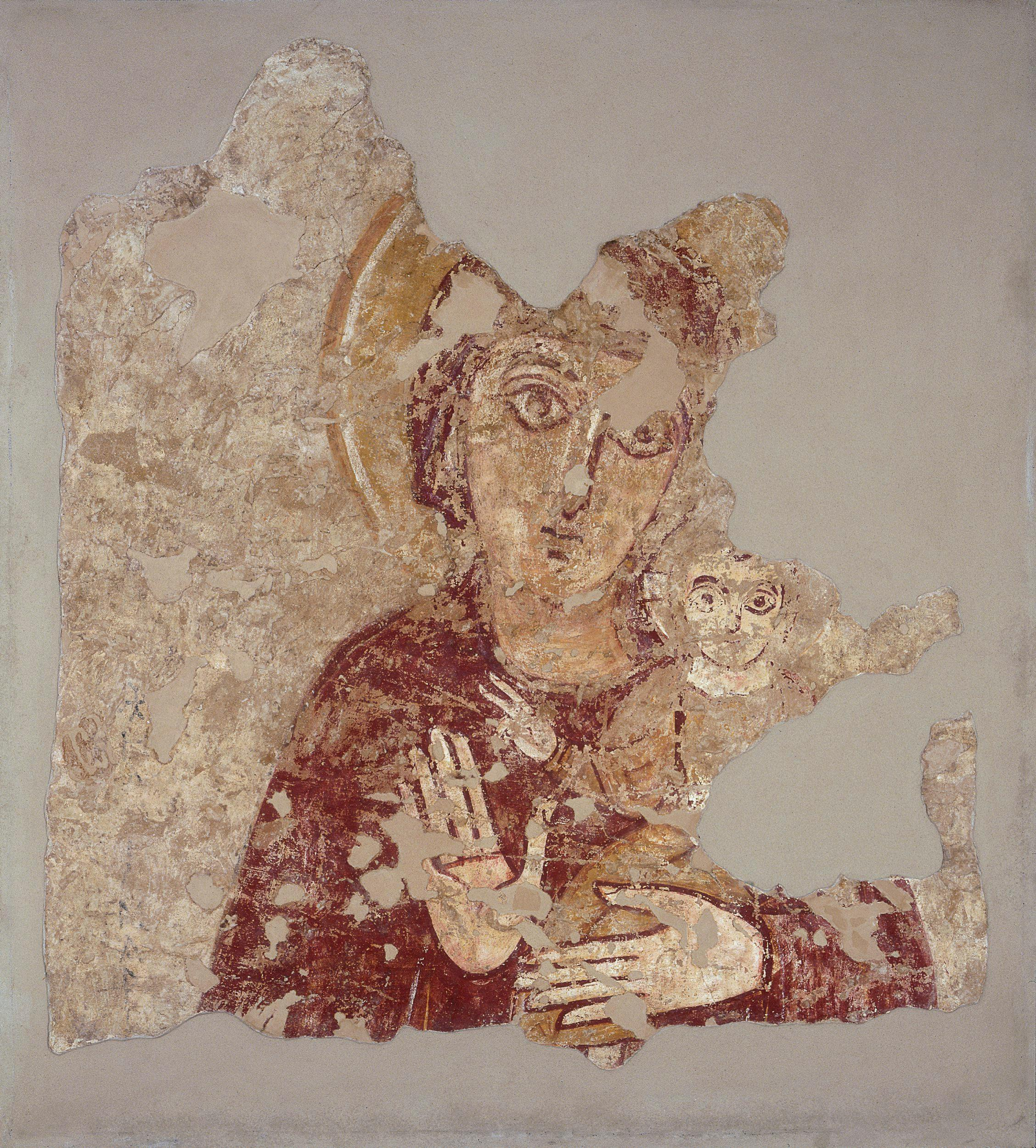
The Virgin and Child

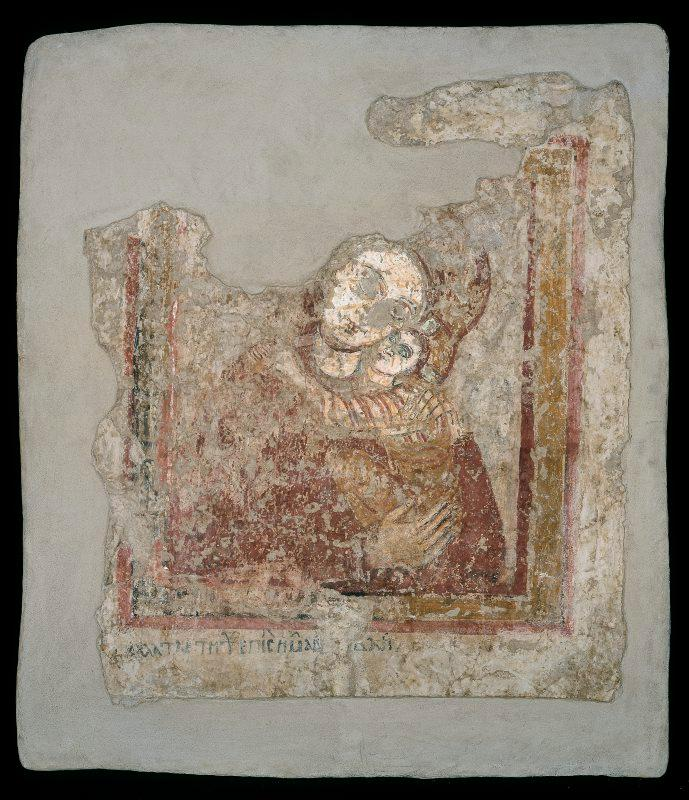
Mother of God Eleusa

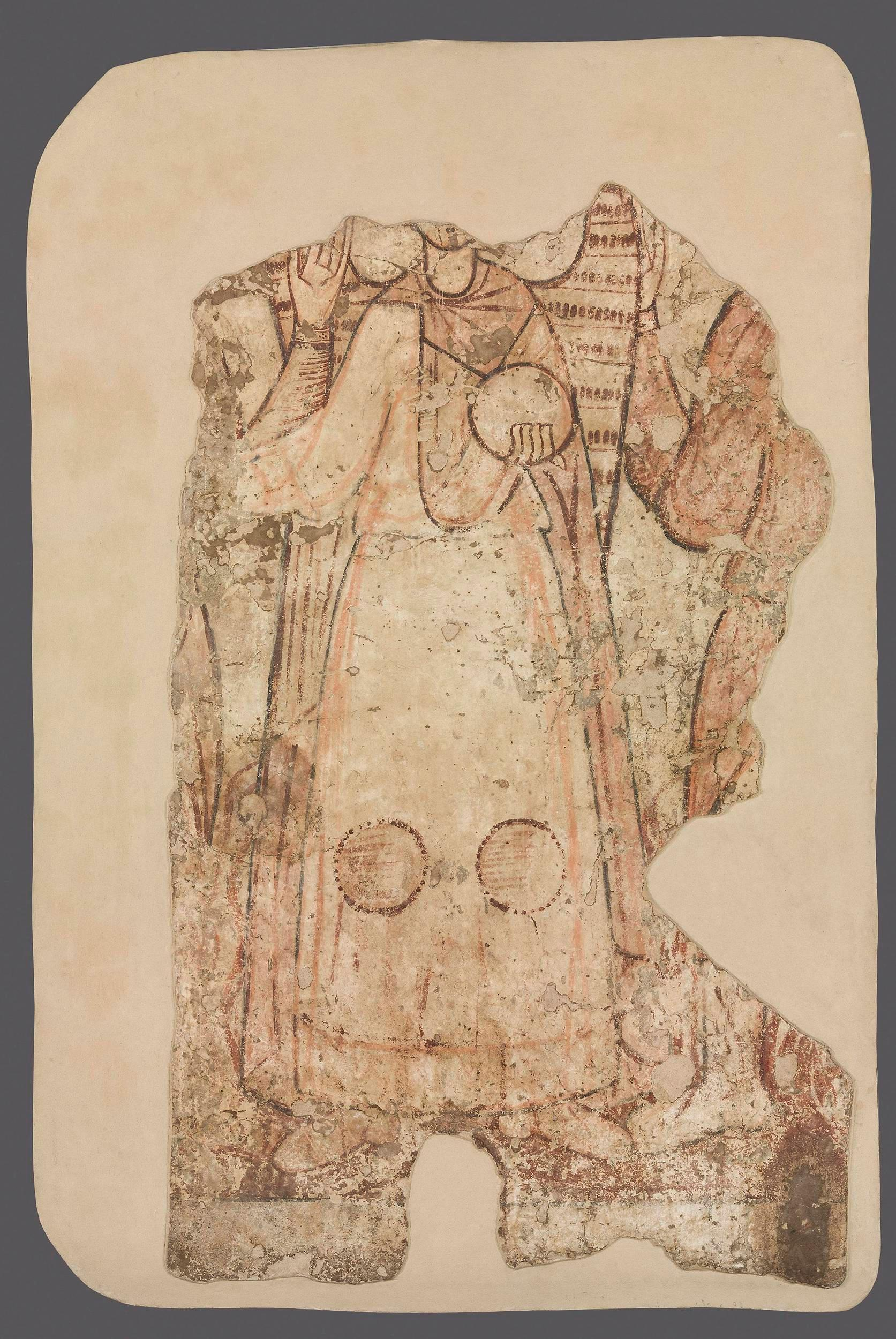
Three young men in the fiery furnace

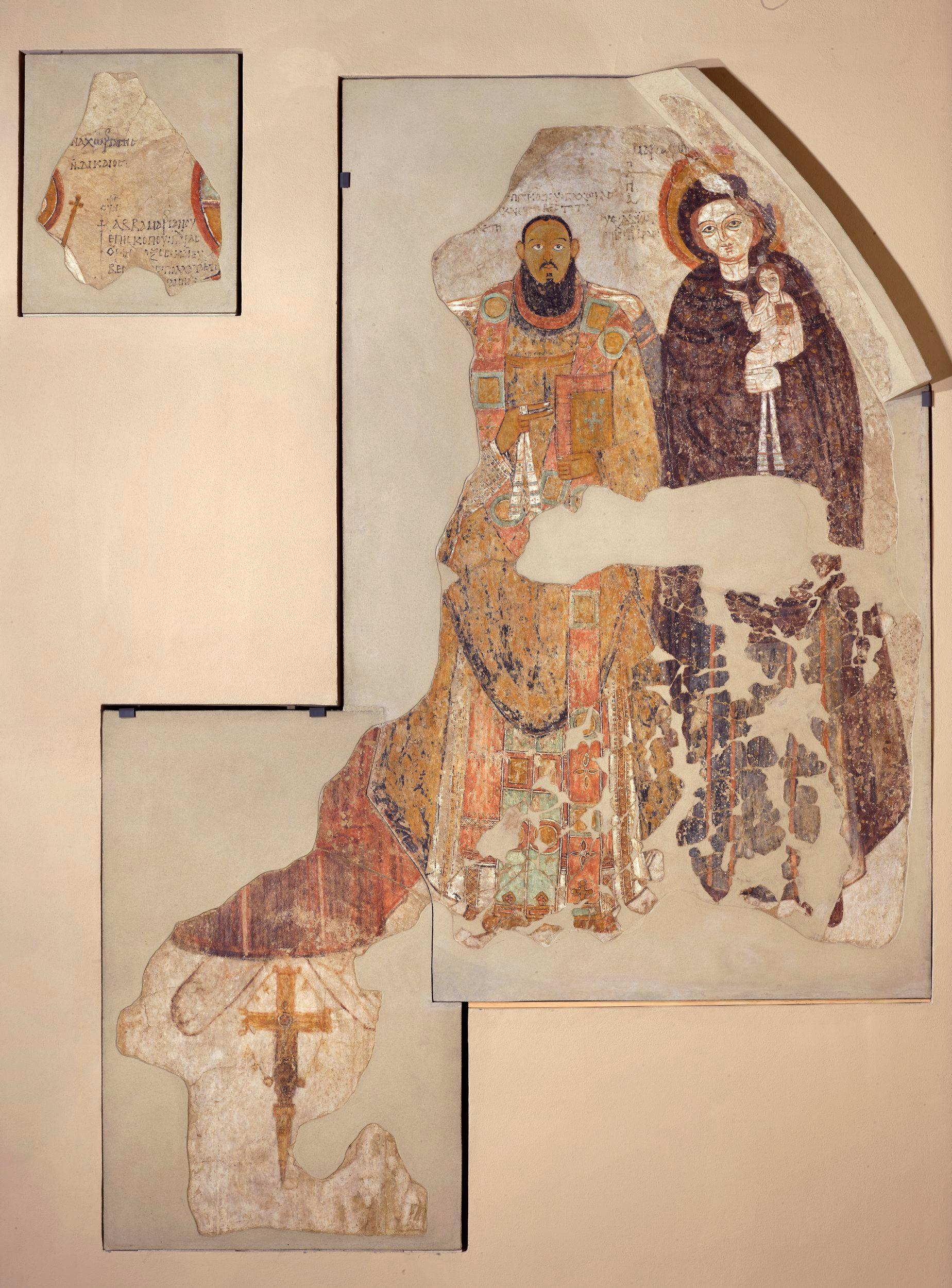
Bishop Marianos with the Virgin and Child

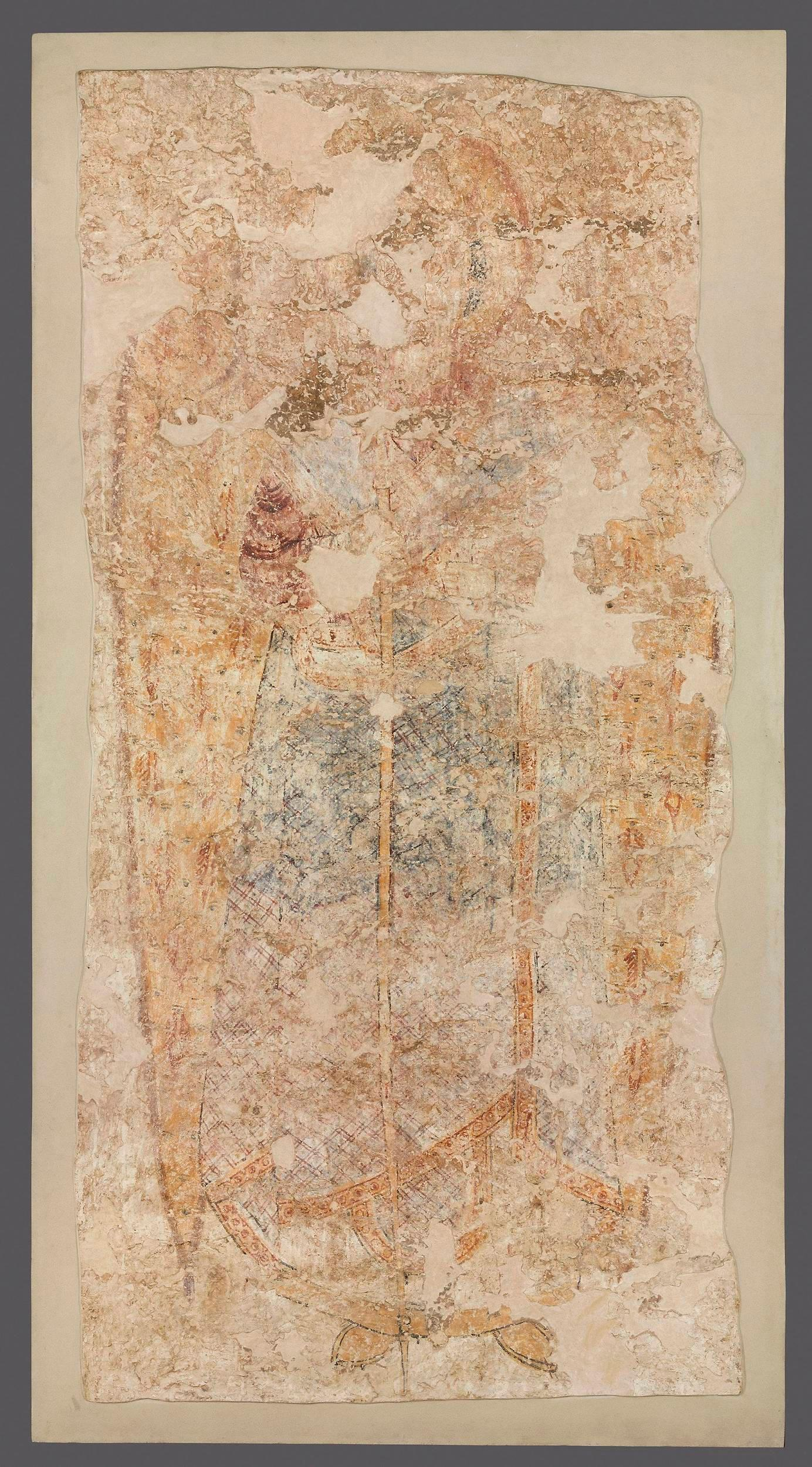
Archangel Michael

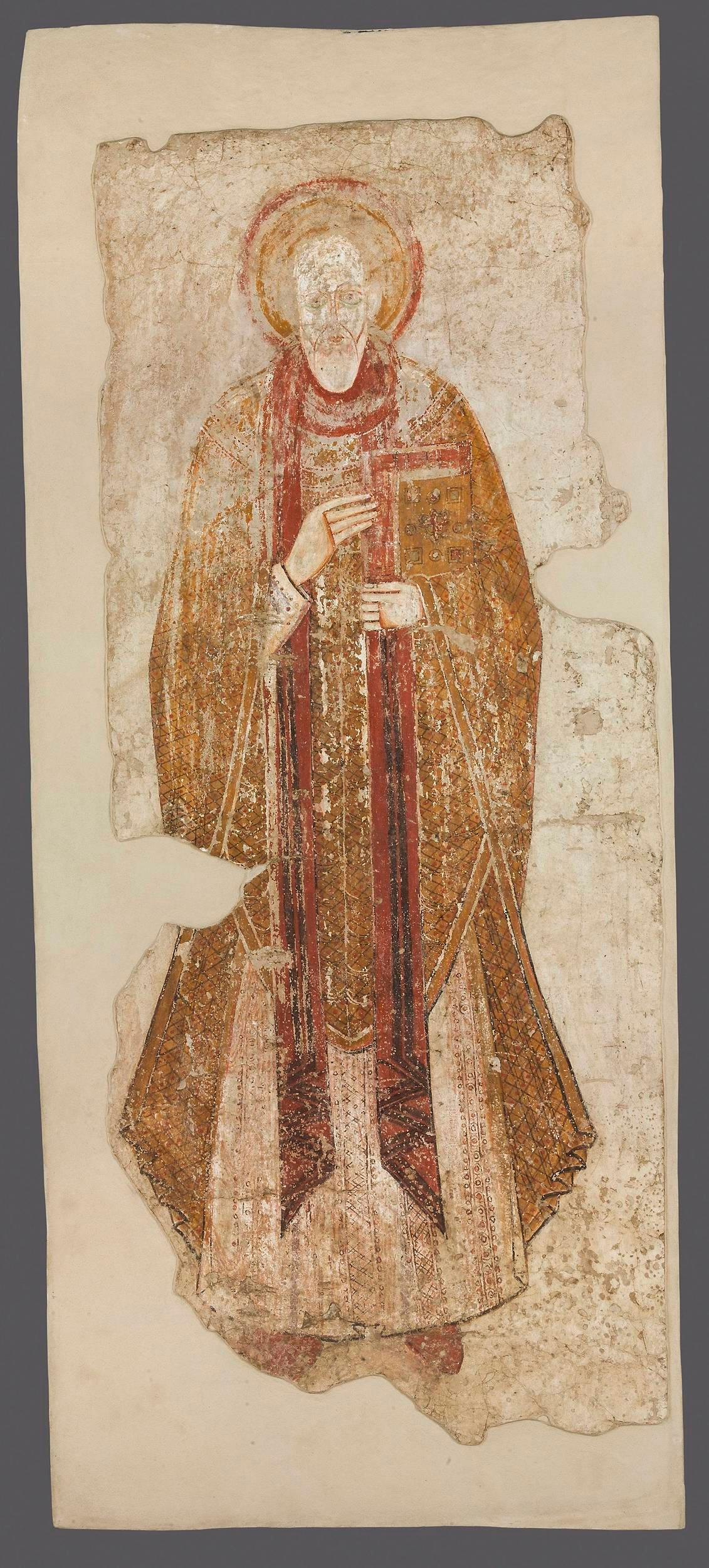
Unidentified holy bishop (possibly Athanasius of Alexandria)

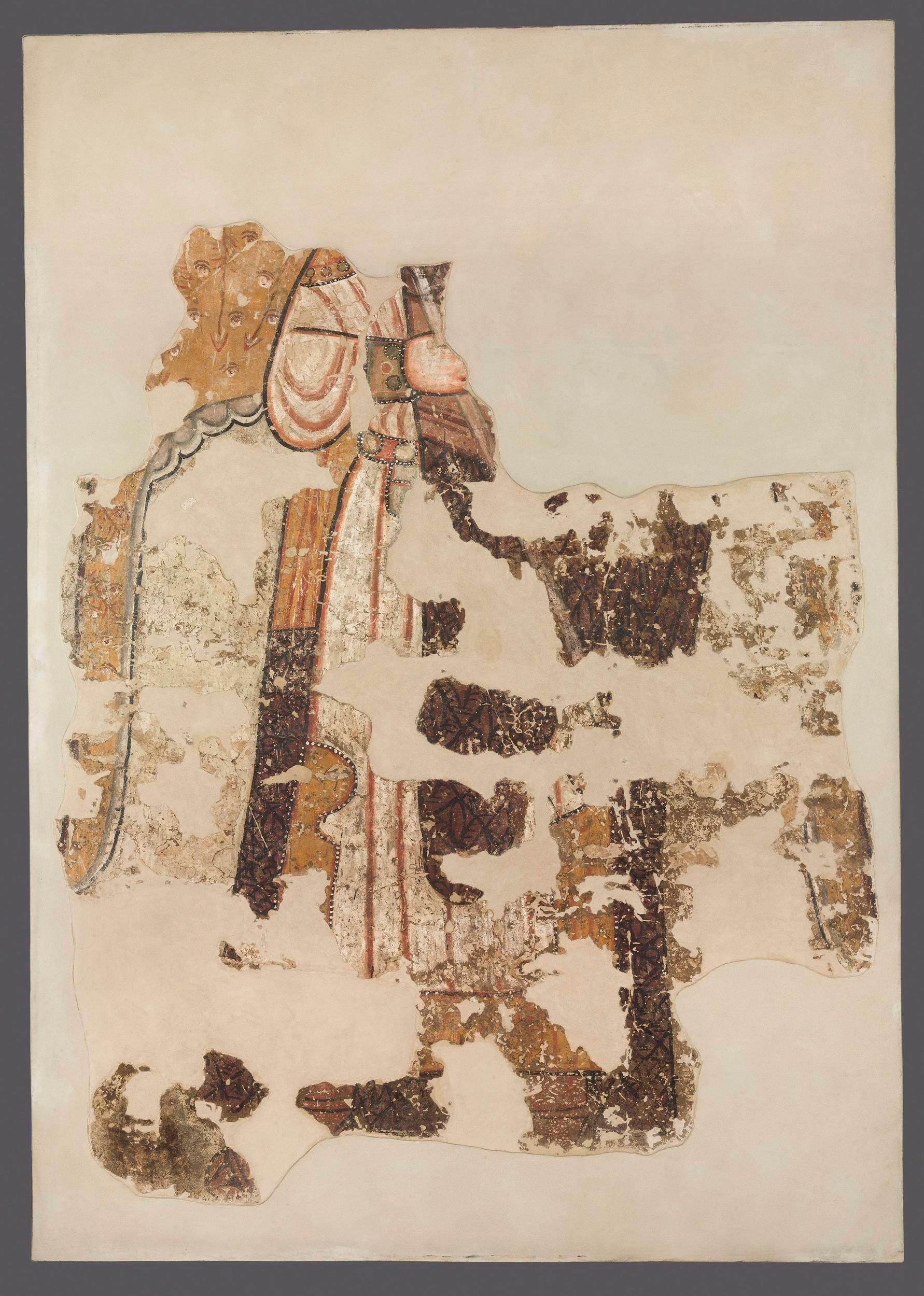
Archangel Michael (figure fragment)

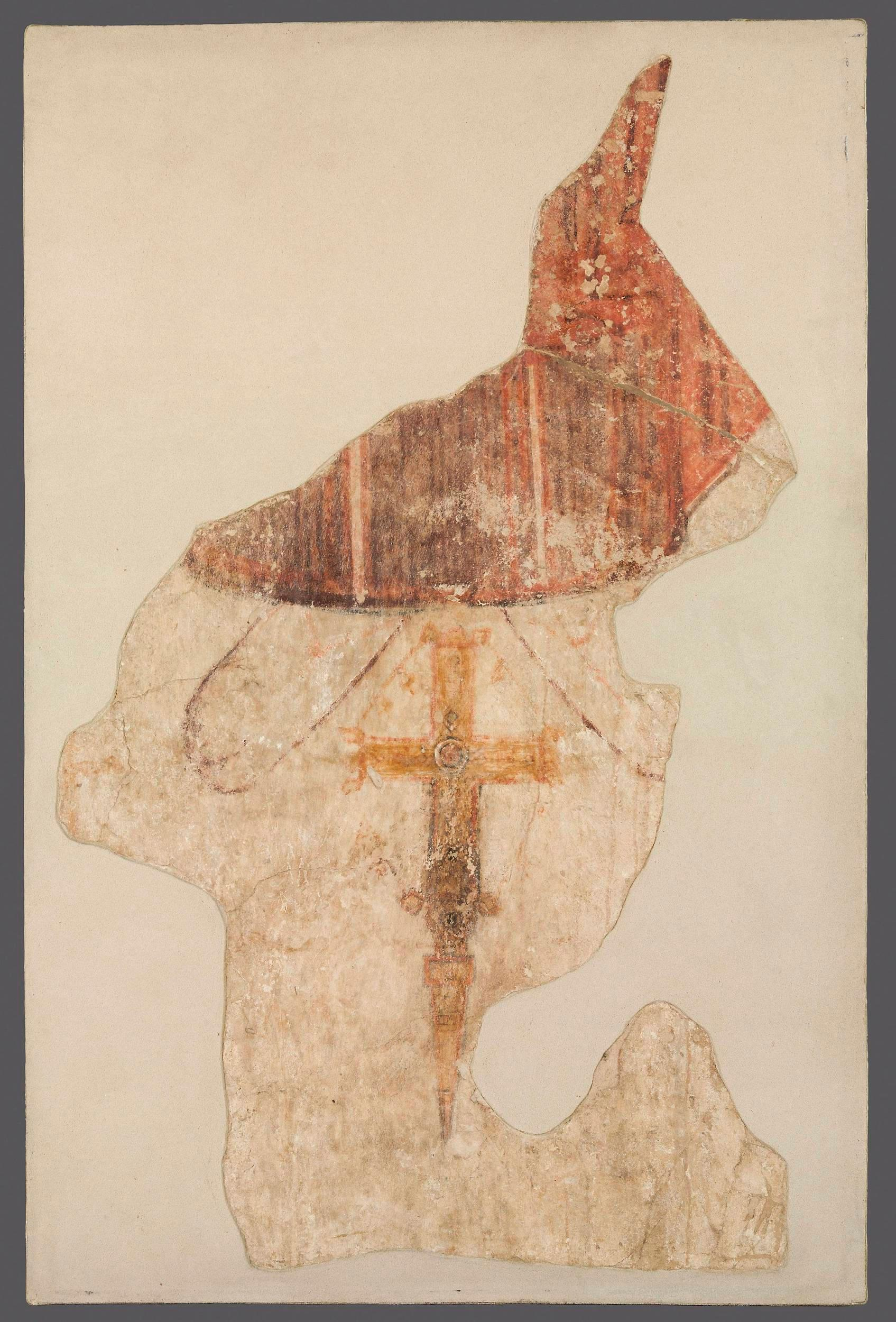
Lower section of the figure of Christ and cross

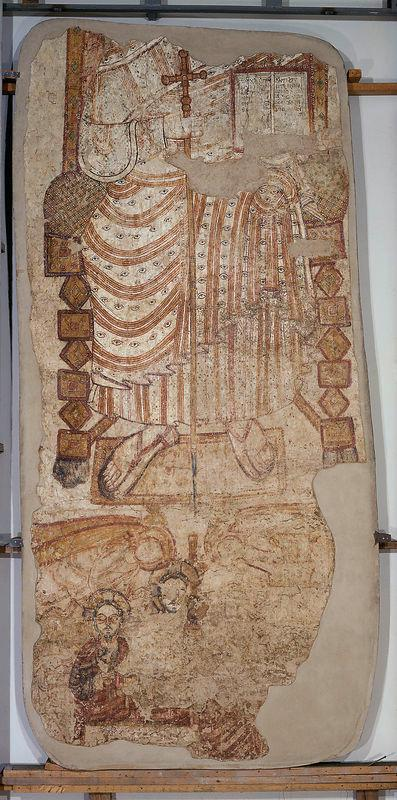
Christ enthroned

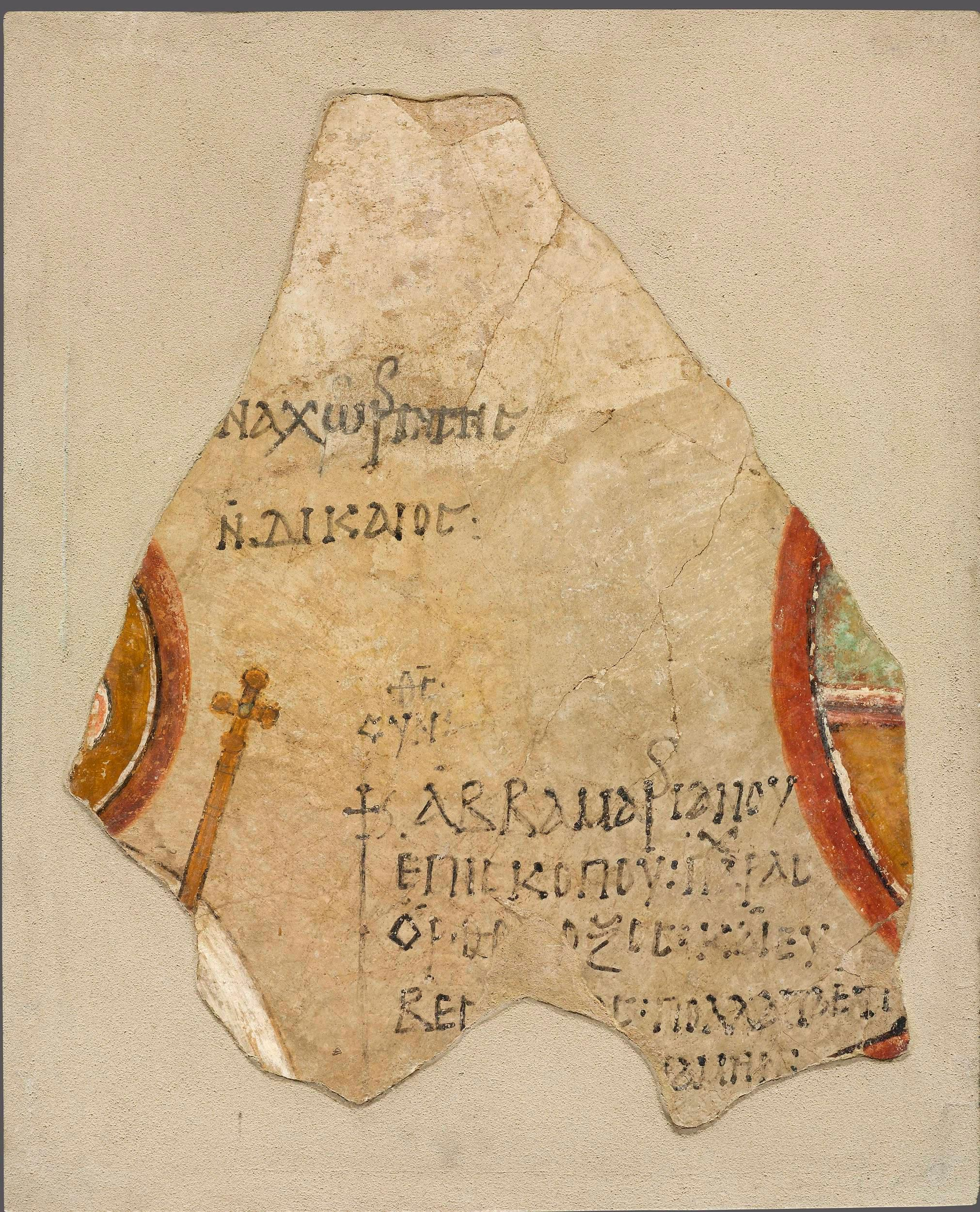
A section of Christ’s nimbus, fragment of the figure of anchorite

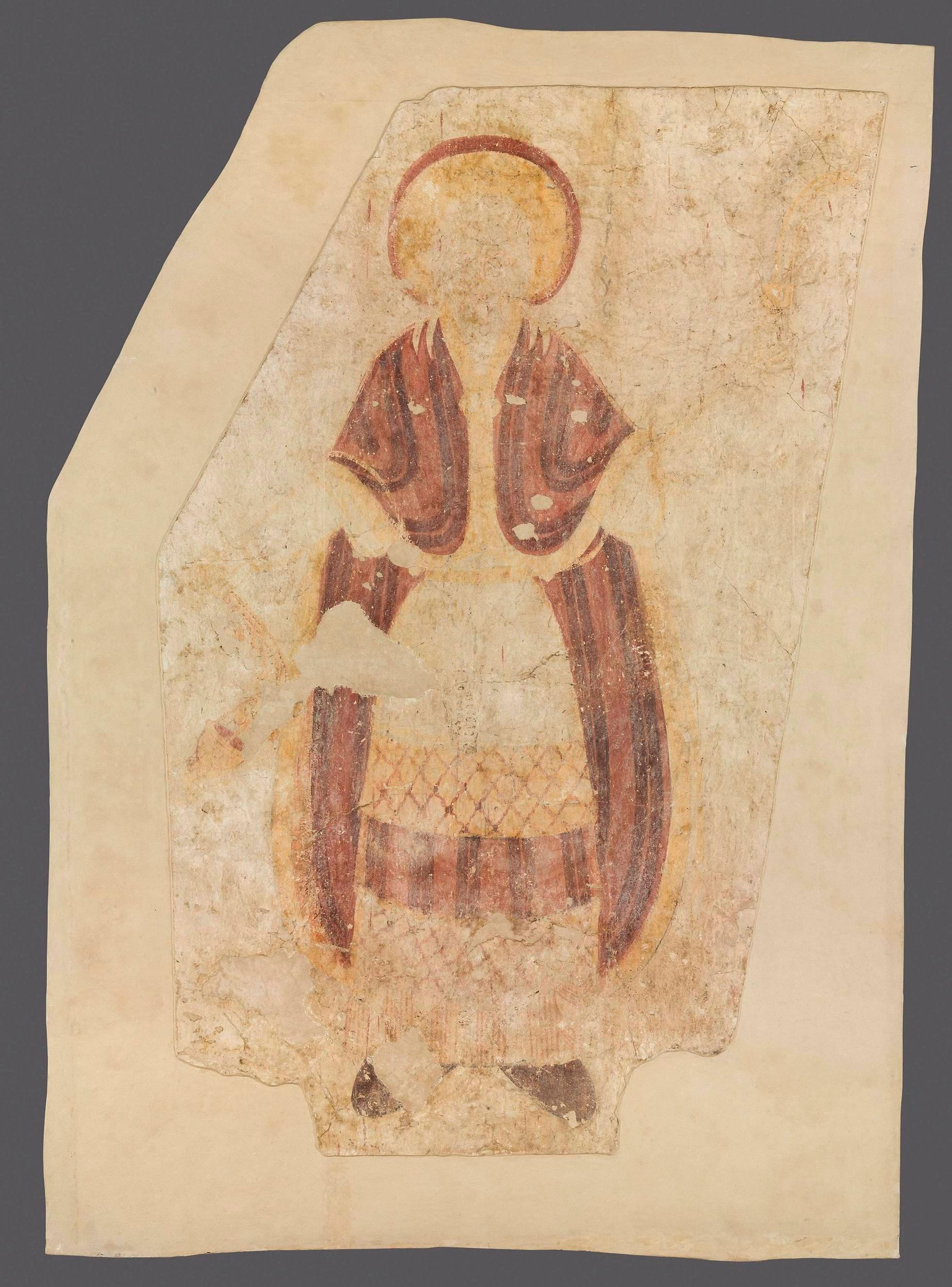
Jewish High Priest

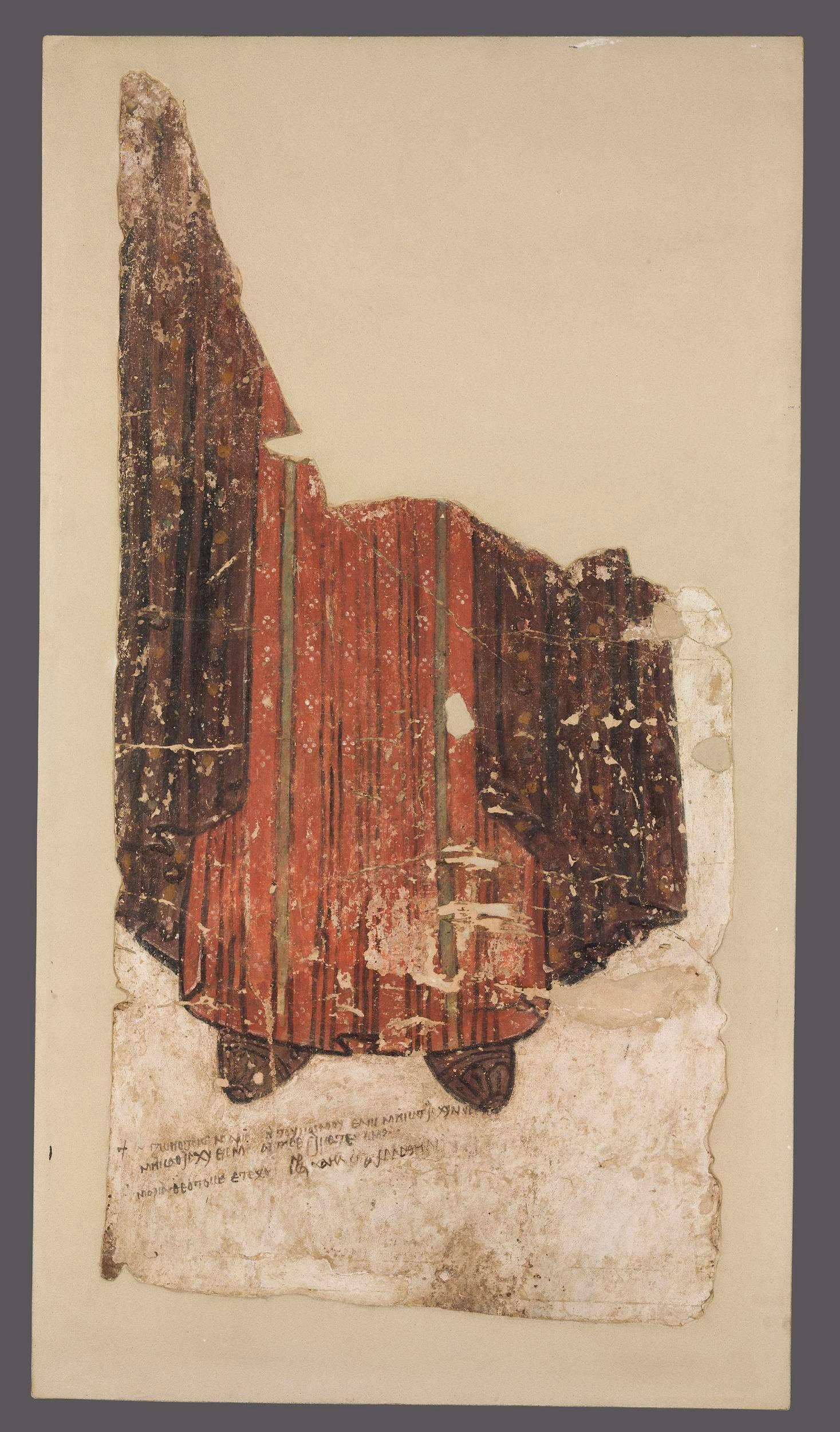
Mother of God (figure fragment)

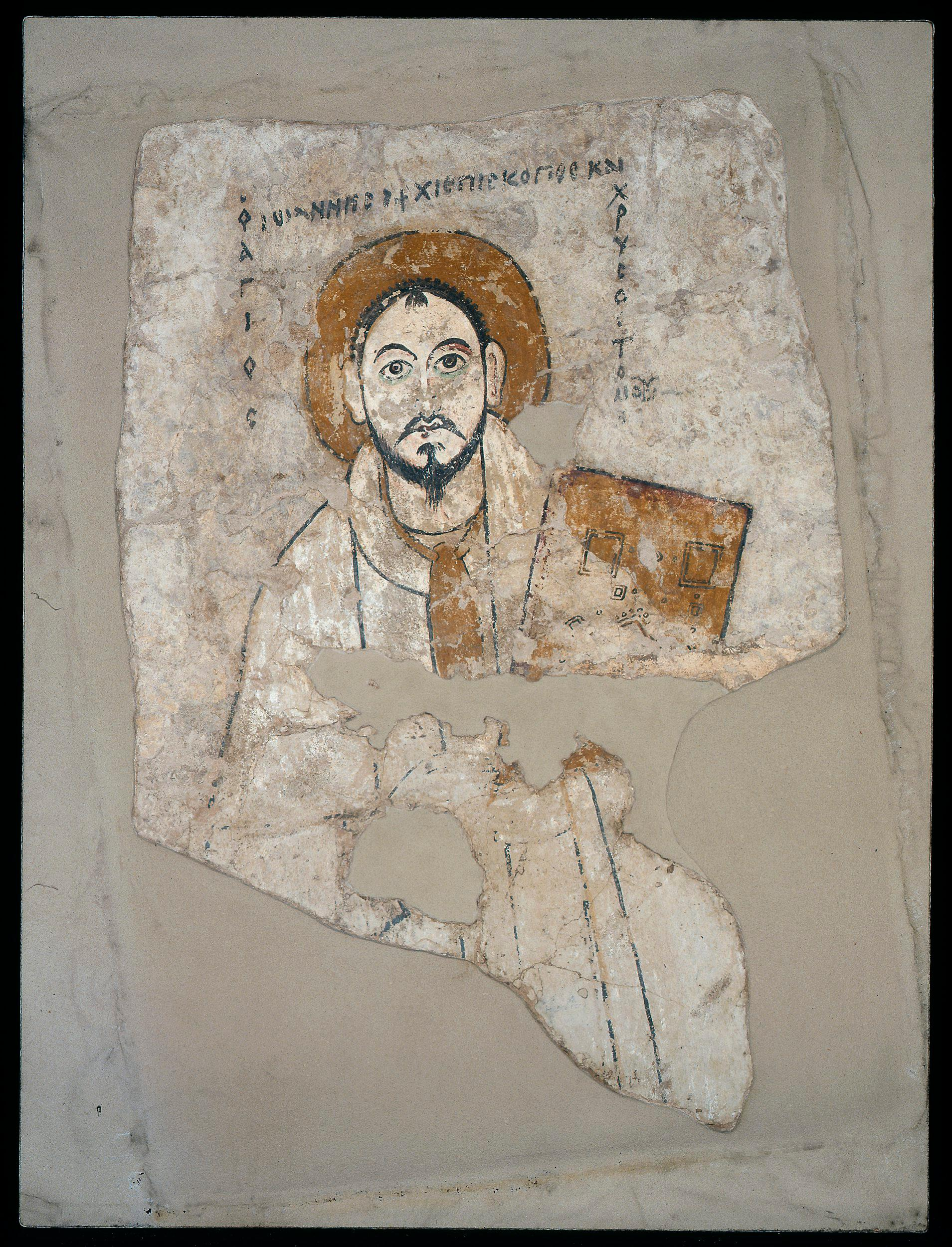
St John Chrysostom

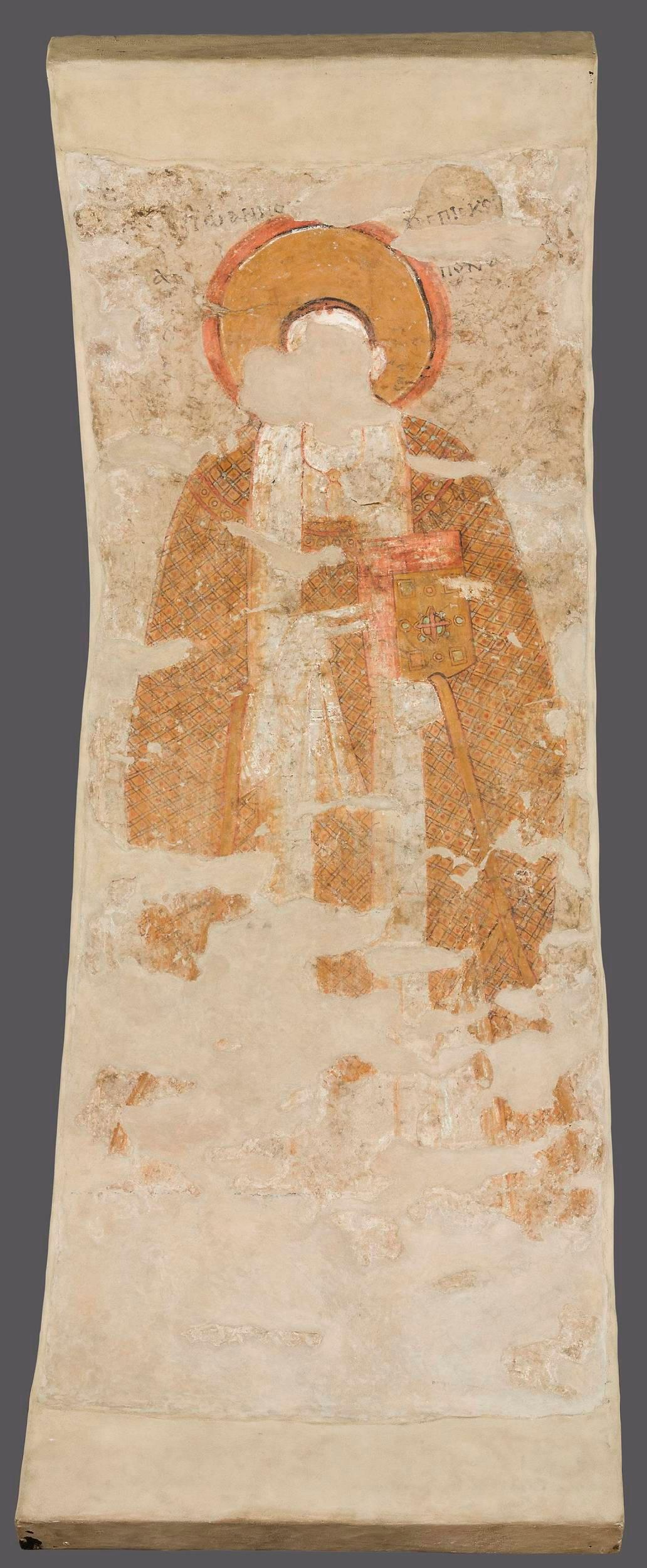
St John Chrysostom

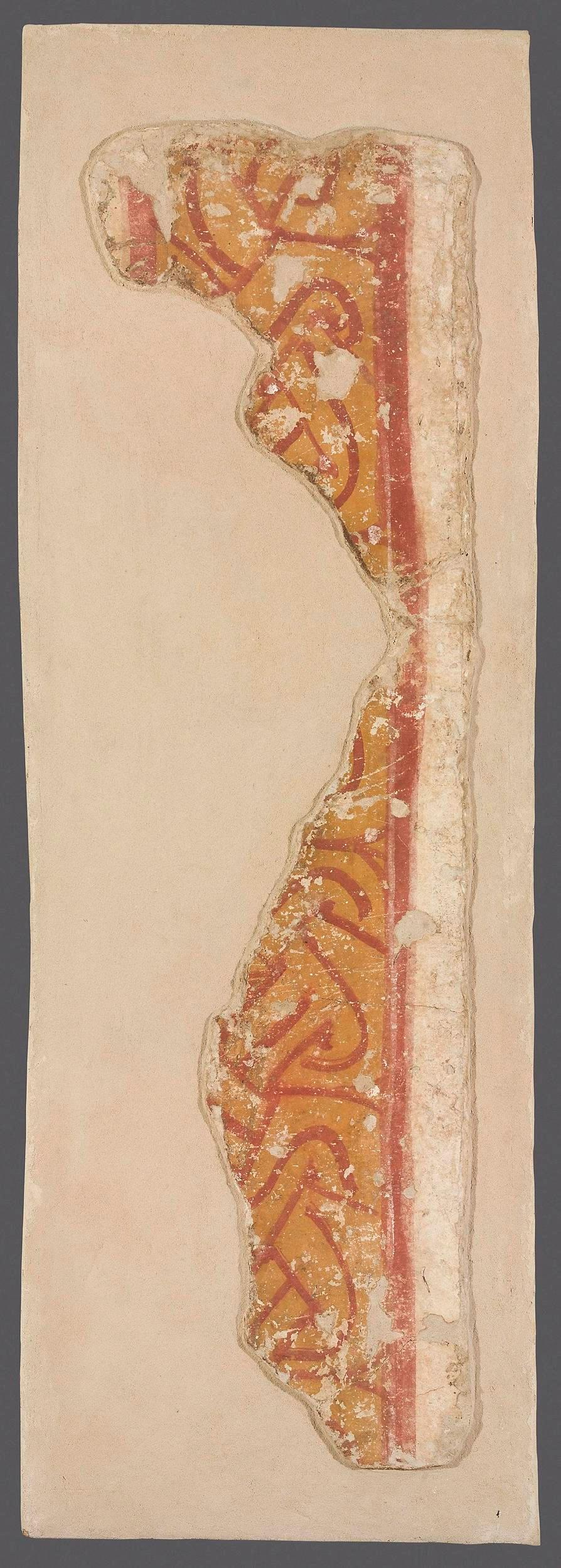
Frieze fragment in the form of a stripe with a plaited pattern

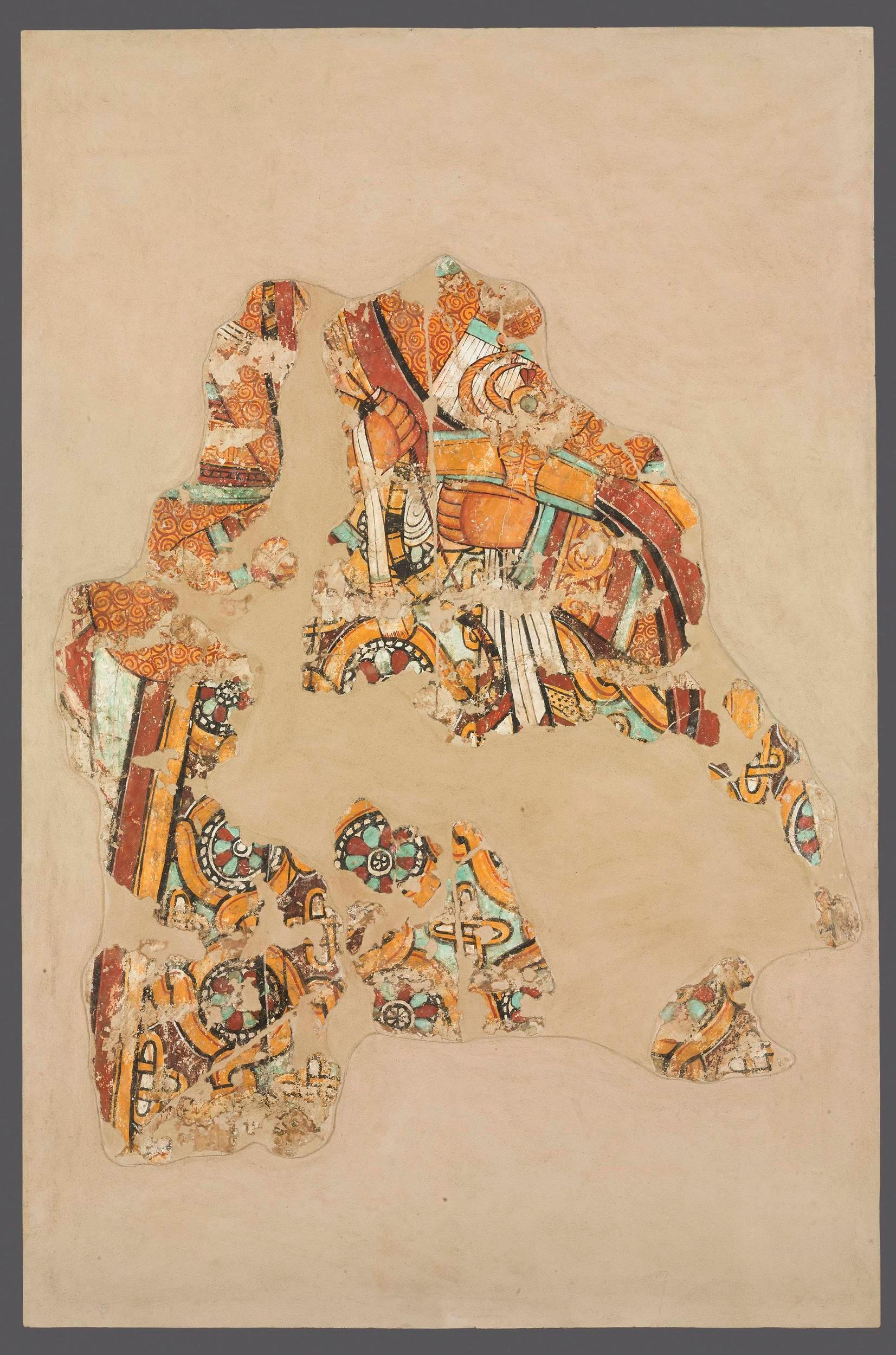
Nubian Eprach with a patron Saint

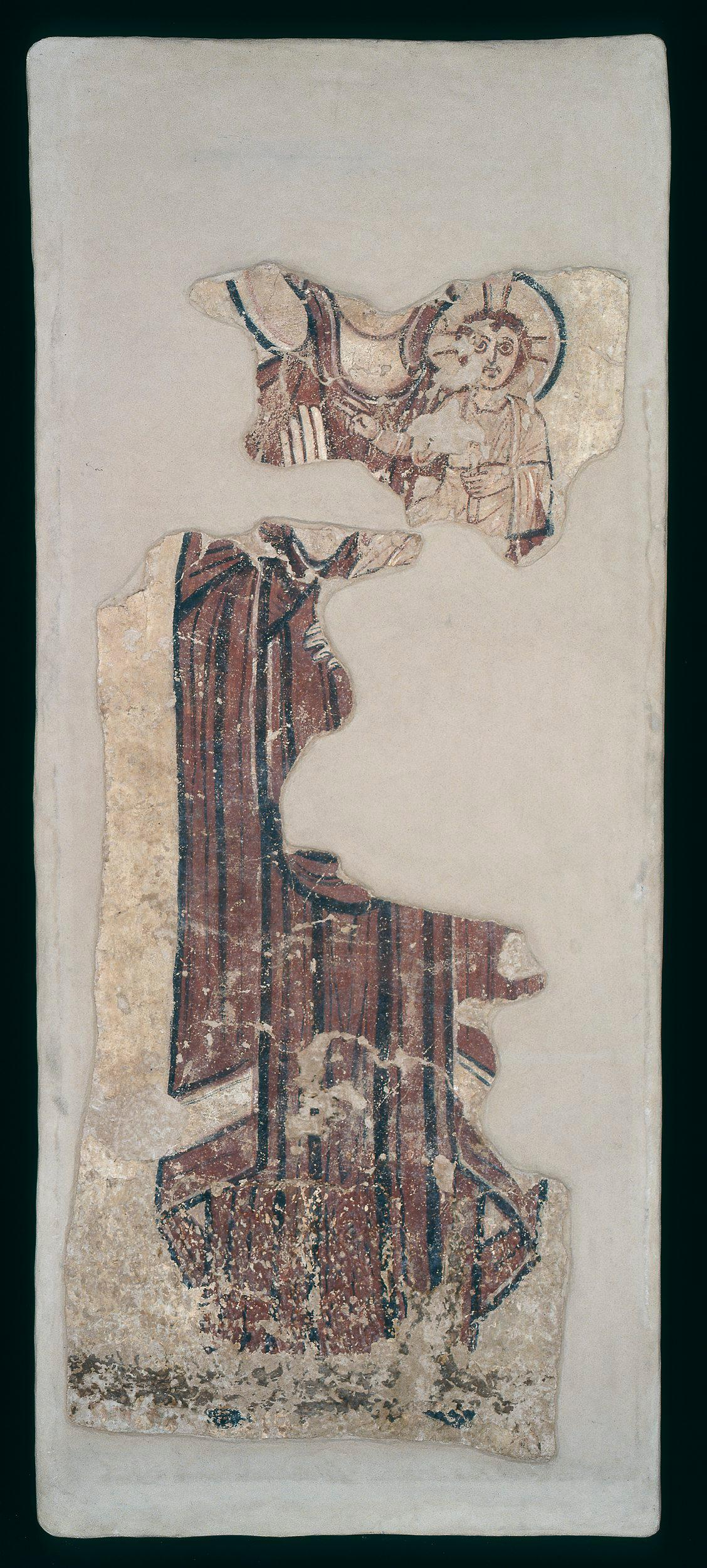
Mother of God Hodegetria

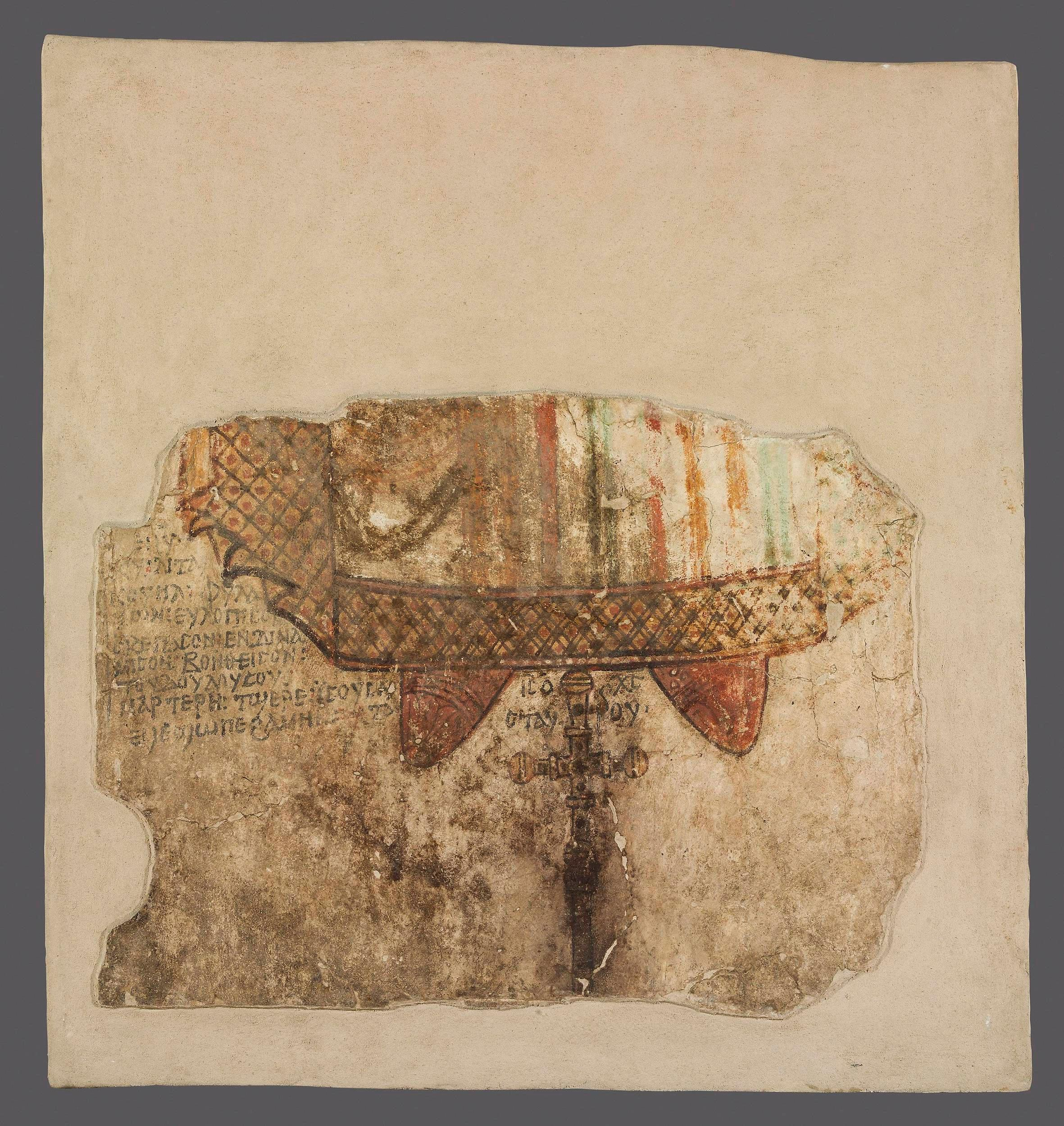
Angel Litakskuel (figure fragment)

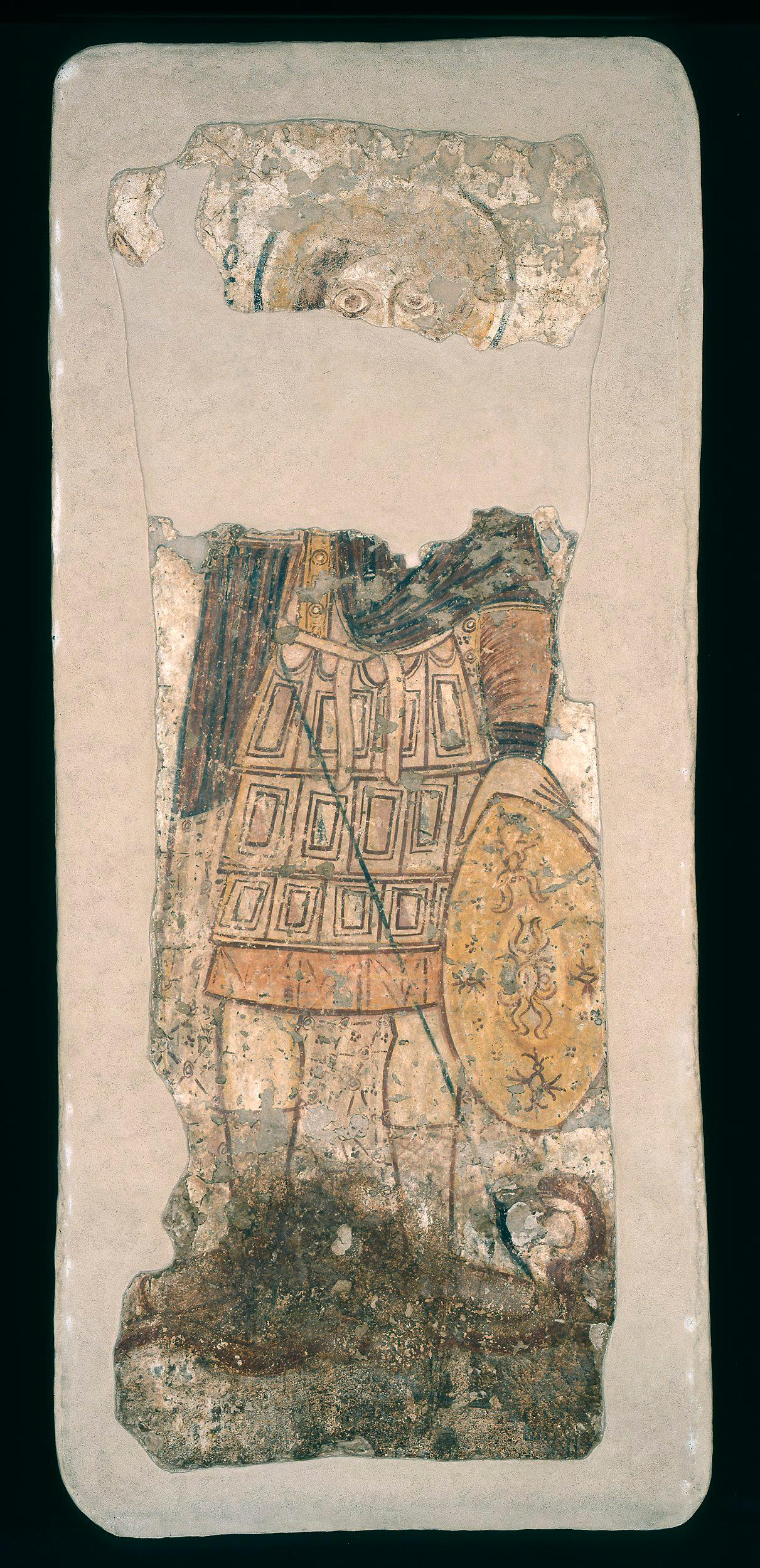
Holy Warrior (Theodore Stratelates)

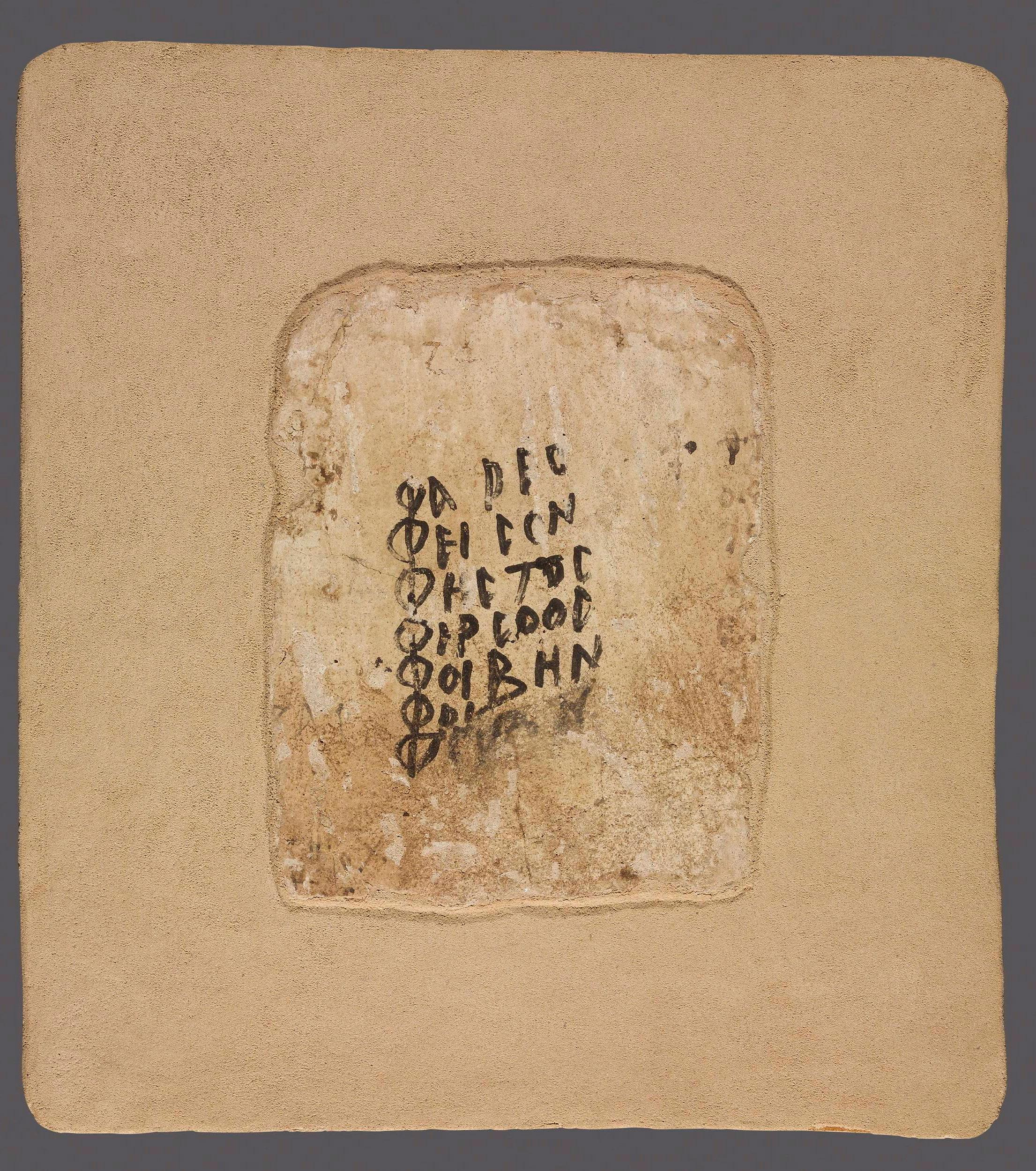
Fragment of inscription on plaster

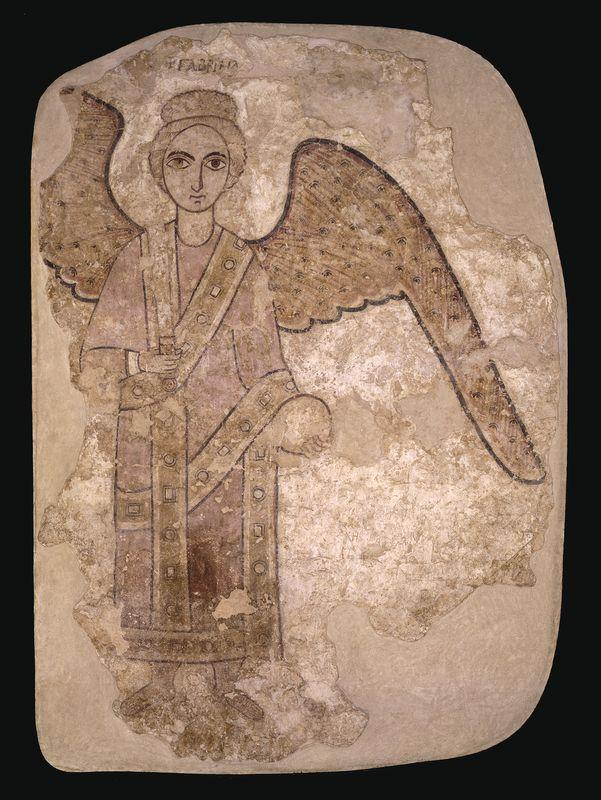
Archangel Gabriel

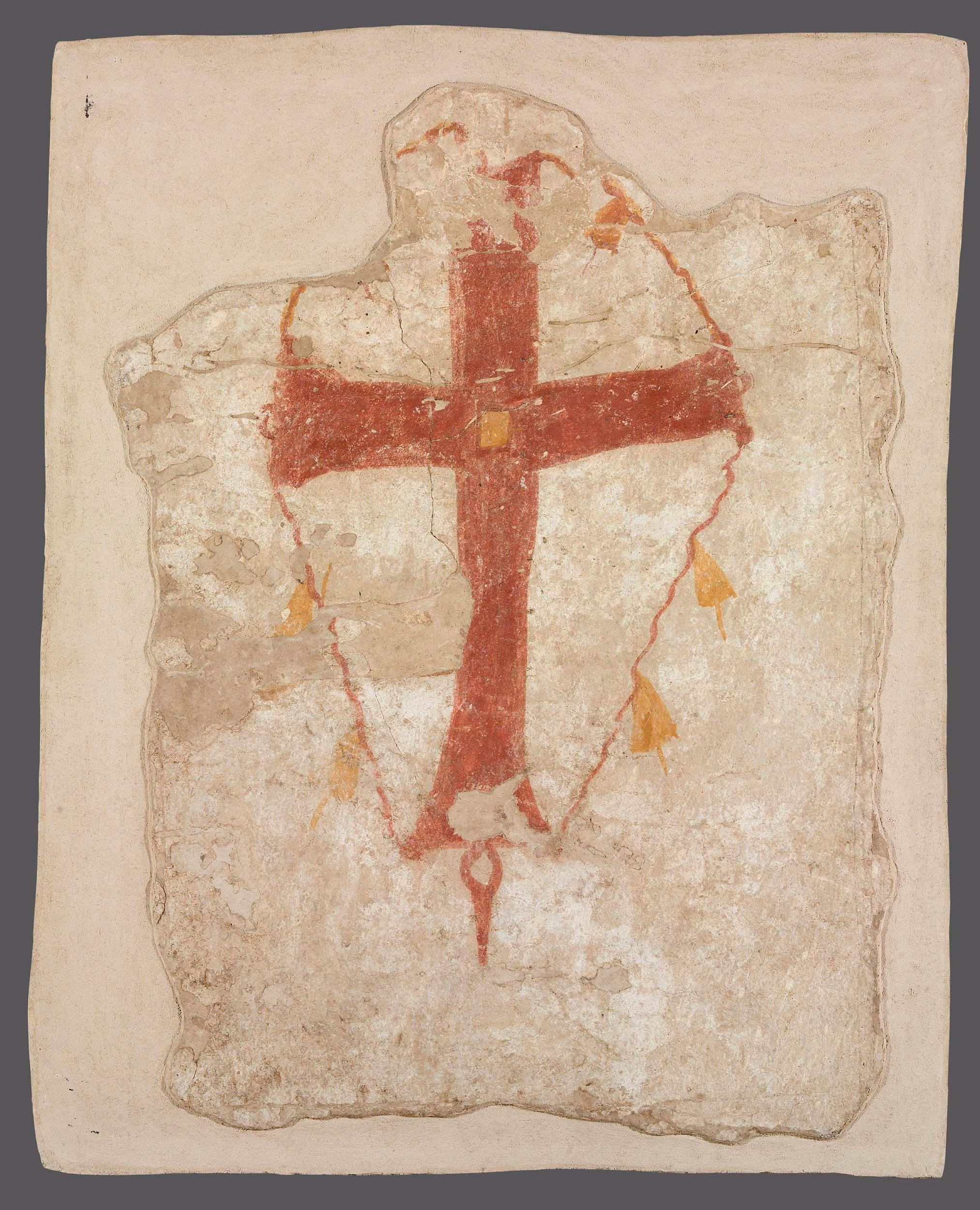
Cross

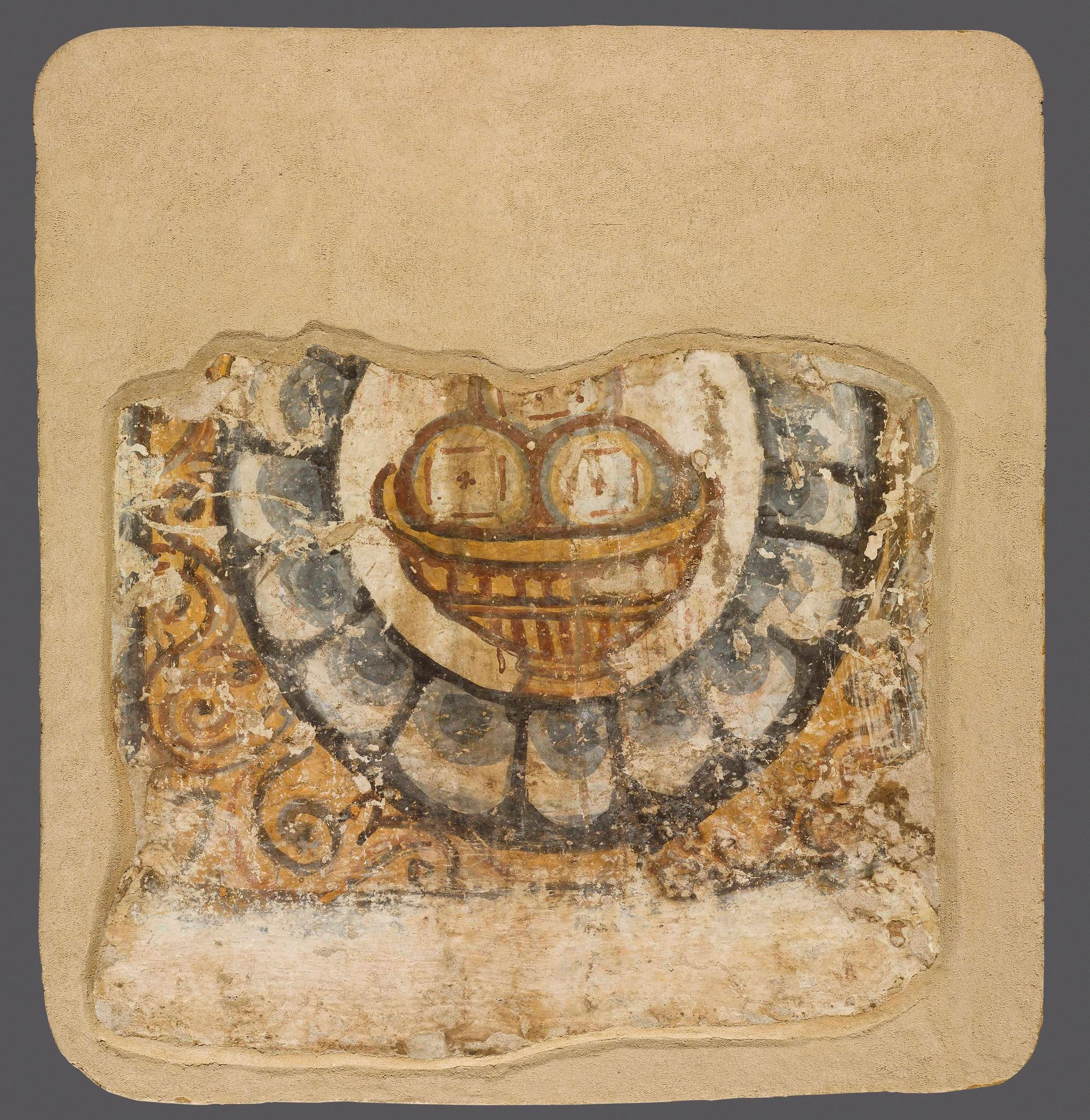
Utensil with three bread loafs

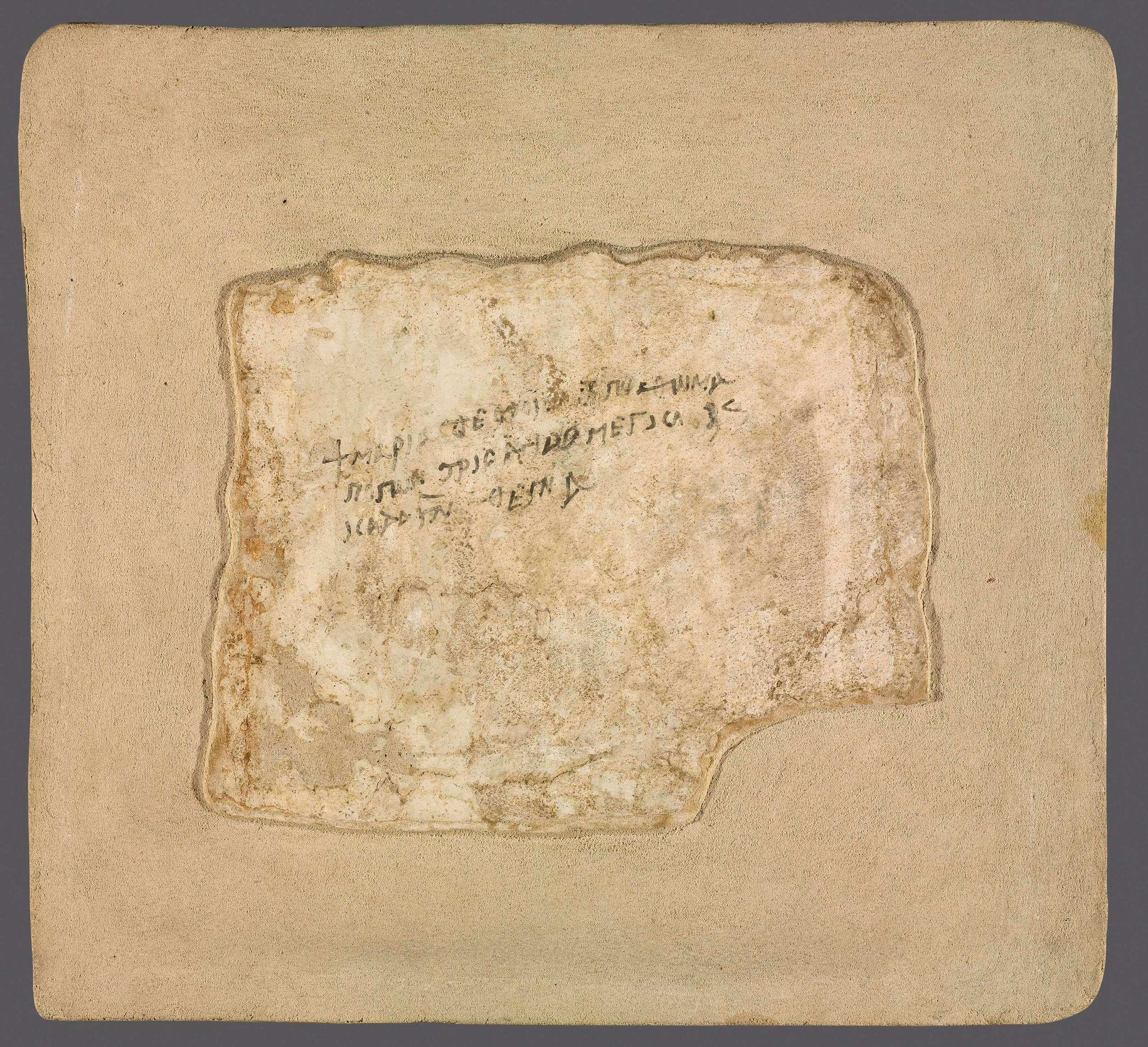
Graffito on plaster

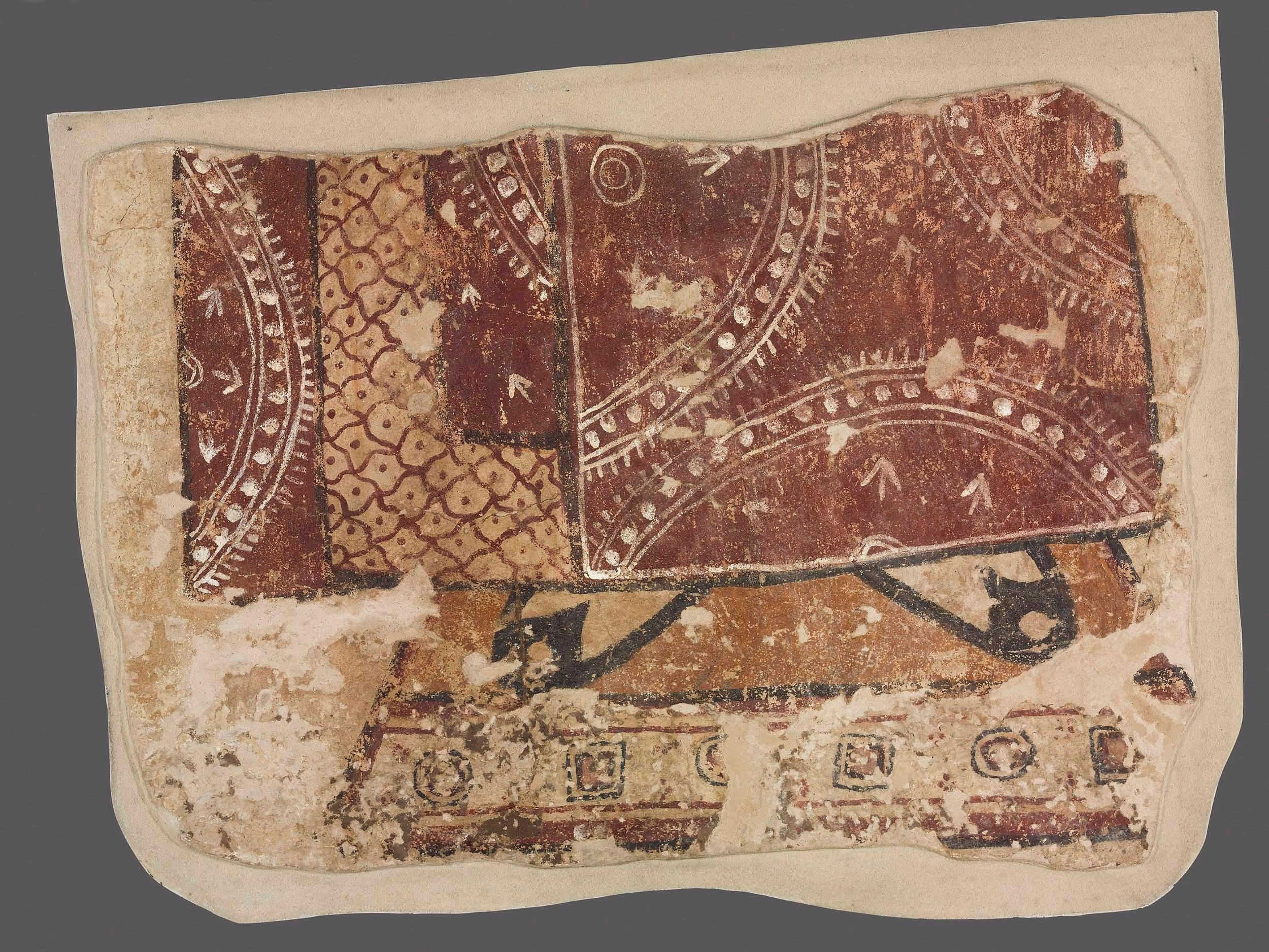
Lower section of an unidentified figure

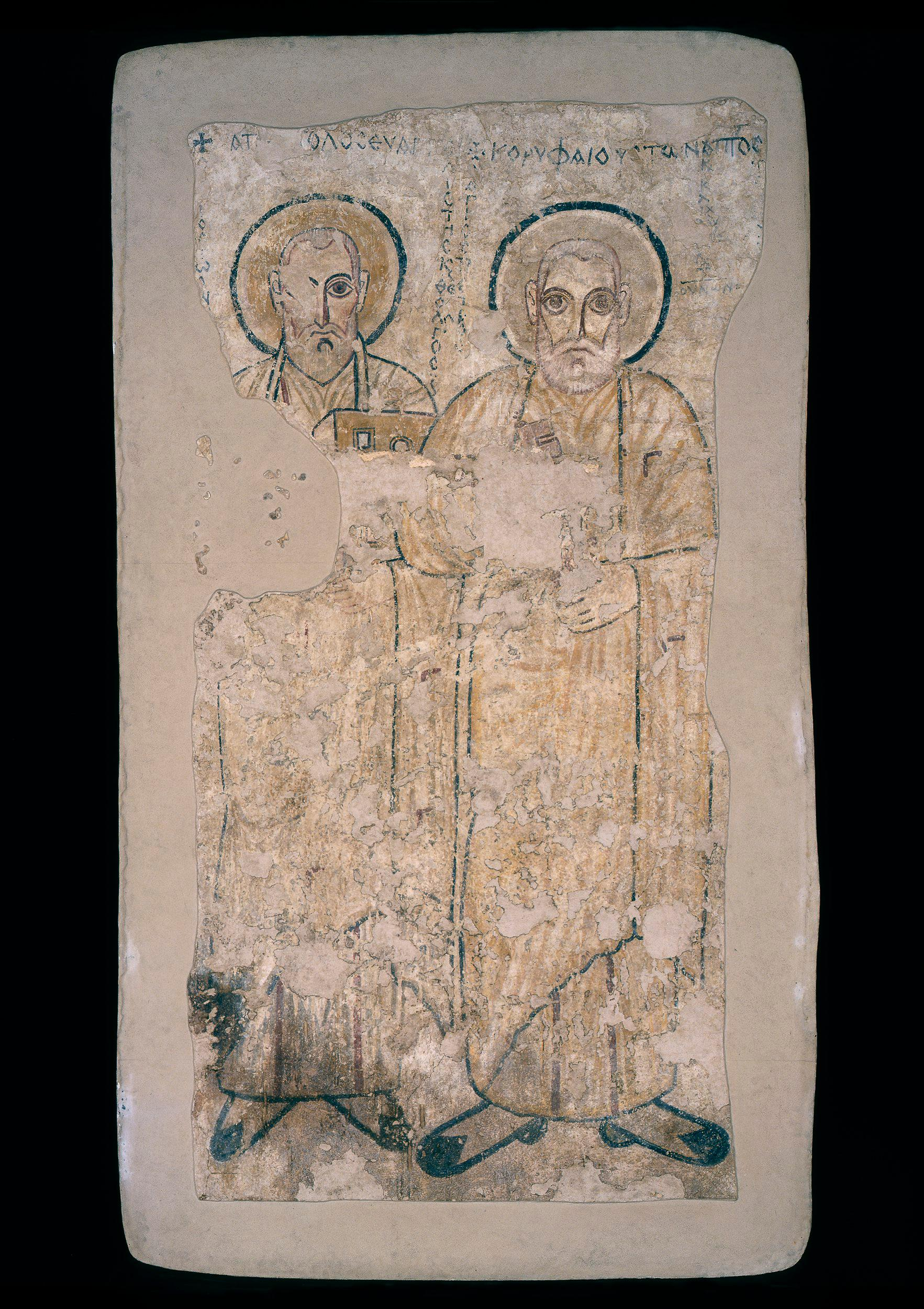
Saints Peter and John the Apostles

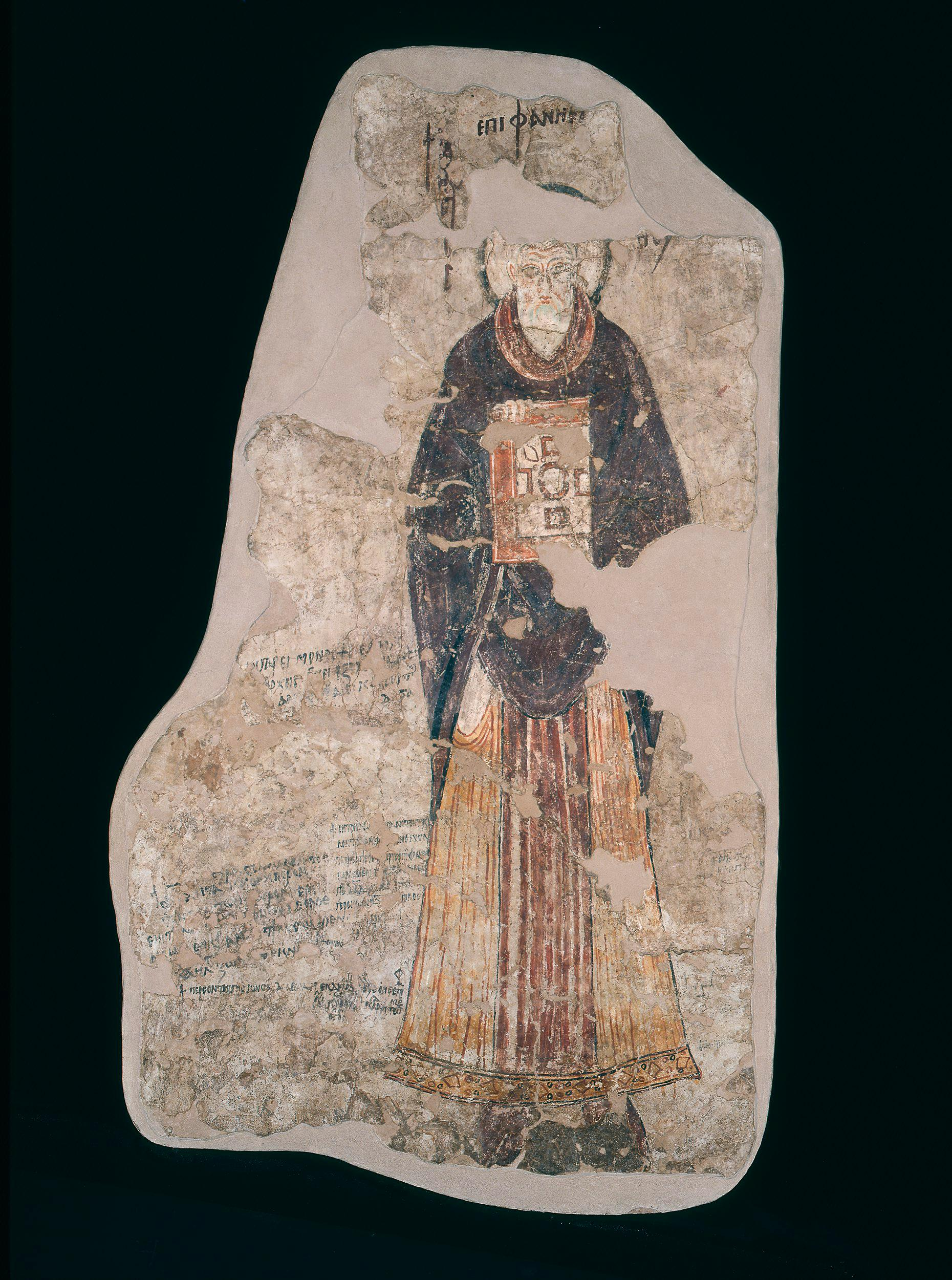
St Epiphanius

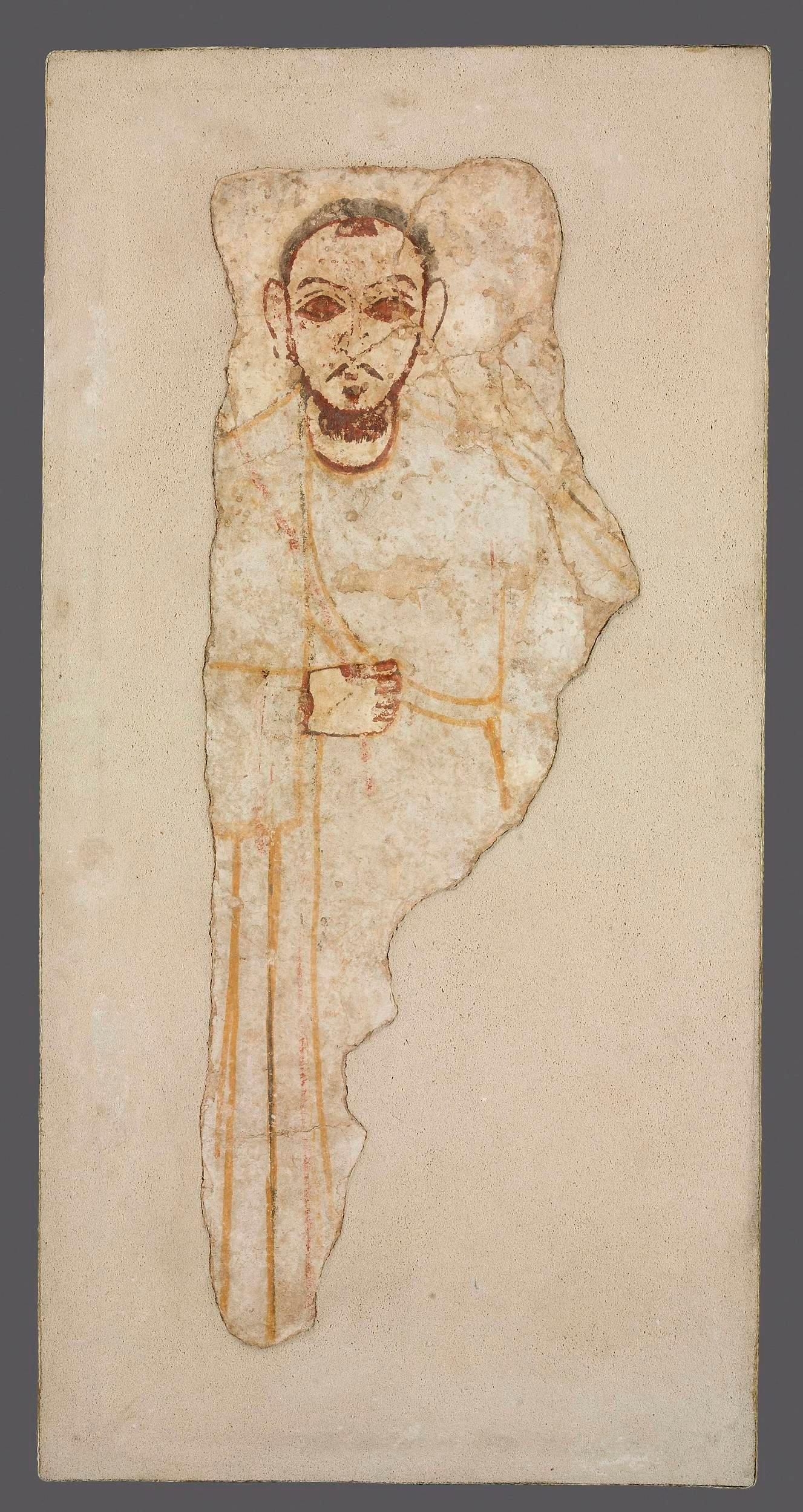
Deacon

== See also ==
- Faras
- Faras Cathedral
- National Museum in Warsaw
- Kazimierz Michałowski
- Bishop Petros with Saint Peter the Apostle
