= Banganarti =

Banganarti بنقنارتي
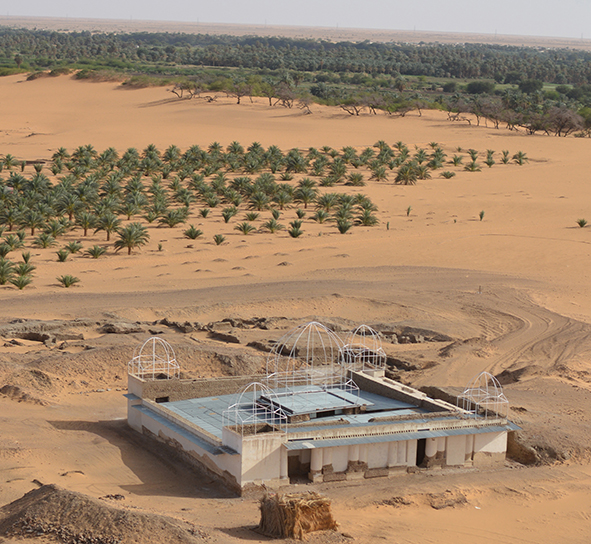
- Banganarti site in 2014

- Location of Banganarti in Sudan
- Coordinates: 18°10′0″N 30°47′06″E
- Country: Sudan
- State: Northern
- Time zone: UTC+2 (CAT)

Banganarti (Arabic: بنقنارتي Nobiin: Bángànarti (Island of the Locust) is a small village in Sudan, about halfway between the third and fourth cataract of the Nile. It is situated 10 kilometres (6.2 mi) from Old Dongola, the capital of Makuria. Banganarti was an important Christian pilgrim center; the remains of a substantial medieval church are near the village (18.166736,30.784785).

== Excavations ==
=== Polish archaeological research ===
Polish archaeologists have worked at the site since 1998. Banganarti was included in the field prospection carried out as part of the Southern Dongola Reach Survey, directed by Bogdan Żurawski, after which started the excavations (in 2001). Earlier, from 1984, the site was studied by an expedition from the Royal Ontario Museum. The Polish expedition is organized by the Polish Centre of Mediterranean Archaeology University of Warsaw, the Institute of Mediterranean and Oriental Cultures of the Polish Academy of Sciences, and (since 2016) the Institute of Archaeology, University of Rzeszów. It conducts archaeological excavations and conservation and reconstruction works in cooperation with the Sudanese National Corporation for Antiquities and Museums (NCAM).

In the first seasons, the work focused on the large church in Banganarti. It consists of two successive buildings, dating respectively to the seventh and the eleventh century. Several burials were discovered inside. Both buildings were decorated with high-quality wall paintings. One of the oldest images of the Virgin Mary has been found in the Lower Church.

The younger building, the Upper Church, is called Raphaelion II after its patron, Archangel Raphael. The number ‘II’ was added because Raphael had probably been the patron of the Lower Church as well. The Upper Church functioned from the mid-eleventh to the mid-eighteenth century. It was a pilgrim center, as attested by almost 1,000 inscriptions left by visitors on the walls of the Raphaelion. They are written in Greek, Old Nubian, or a mixture of both. They mention a few Nubian kings and other prominent persons, such as a queen mother, which gives them historical importance.

Wall paintings are among the most important discoveries made in Banganarti. Fifteen were uncovered on the walls of the Lower Church, but they were in much worse condition than the ones decorating the interior of Raphaelion II. The iconographical program of the Upper Church is undoubtedly rooted in political theology and royal propaganda. Of the 57 preserved wall paintings, 13 were hieratic depictions of a king. Large figurative scenes showing a Nubian king protected by an Archangel surrounded by the Apostles are typical. Biblical scenes and depictions of secular figures (rulers and high dignitaries) are also common.

Medieval fortifications built of mudbrick, showing evidence of two fires in the walls’ layers, as well as the remains of a settlement surrounding the sacral buildings, were also studied.

== Bibliography ==
- Żurawski, Bogdan; Cedro, Aneta; Drzewiecki, Mariusz; Łopaciuk, Roman (2017). Fieldwork in 2015/2016 in the Southern Dongola Reach and the Third Cataract Region, Polish Archaeology in the Mediterranean, 26/1.
- Drzewiecki, Mariusz (2017). The medieval fortifications at Banganarti after the 2016 season. Polish Archaeology in Mediterranean 26/1 (2017), DOI: 10.5604/01.3001.0012.1790
- Żurawski, Bogdan (2014). Kings and Pilgrims. St Raphael Church II at Banganarti, mid-eleventh to mid-eighteenth century, Warsaw: Wydawnictwo Neriton / IKŚiO PAN.
- Żurawski, Bogdan (2012). St Raphael Church I at Banganarti, mid-sixth to mid-eleventh Century. An introduction to the site and the epoch (=Gdańsk Archaeological Museum African Reports 10), Gdańsk: Gdańsk Archaeological Museum.
- Zurawski, Bogdan (2012). Banganarti on the Nile. An archaeological guide (PDF). Archived from the original (PDF) on 2018-09-24.
- Zurawski, Bogdan (2003). The Dongola Reach, The "Southern Dongola Reach Survey Project", 2002, Polish Archaeology in the Mediterranean XIV
- Łajtar, Adam (2003). Wall Inscriptions in the Banganarti Churches. A General Note after Three Seasons of Work. Journal of Juristic Papyrology 33.
