= Al-Maris =

Al-Maris (Arabic: المريس) was a Medieval Arabic name for Lower Nubia, the region of the Nile around the first and second cataracts, including Aswan. Because most of the sources for Nubian history during the period are in Arabic, it is sometimes used interchangeably with the Nubian region of Nobadia. The northern section of al-Maris was part of Fatimid Upper Egypt and was semi-independent under the Kanz ad-Dawla between 1046 and 1077 AD. The Kanz ad-Dawla Nasir invaded Nubia in 1066 but was repulsed and his territory raided.

The main towns were Aswan (Greek Syene) in Egypt and Faras (Coptic Bakharas, Greek Pakhoras, Arabic Bajrash) and Fort Ibrim (Coptic Phrim, Greek Primis) in Nobadia.

The area was occupied by Saladin's brother, al-Malik al-Mu'azzam Shams ad-Dawla Turanshah (Turan-Shah) from 1172 to 1174, but the Ayyubids withdrew a few years later. Some parts were overrun by the Banu Kanz and others were held by the Christian kings at Dotawo. It was nominally annexed to Mamluk Egypt by Baybars in 1276, but continued to be at least partially ruled by autonomous Christian kings at Dotawo until its conquest by Sennar in 1504.

== See also ==
- Luxor
- Nobatia
- Banu Kanz
