= Phonen =

King of the Blemmyes in Nubia

Phonen was king of Blemmyes, known from a letter which was found in Qasr Ibrim, Lower Nubia, in 1976. The papyrus letter comes perhaps from some royal archive and dates the rule of Phonen to around 450 AD.

The letter had been written in bad Greek by Phonen and his son, phylarch Breytek, and was addressed to Aburni, king of Nobatia. This letter represents the answer to another letter which has been lost. It expresses the hostility between the Blemmyes and Nobatian rulers Aburni and Silko; various conflicts between them are listed in the letter. In addition, Phonen mentions negotiations between both kingdoms on regaining lost territories of Blemmyes. It is not clear if Phonen was able to reconquer disputed territory.

Phonen is perhaps identical to a phylarch known from an inscription from Kalabsha, where he appears as "Phonoin".

== Sources ==
- Rea, J. (1979). "The Letter of Phonen to Aburni". Zeitschrift für Papyrologie und Epigraphik. 34: 147–162. JSTOR 20185688.
- Skeat, T. C. (1977). "A Letter from the King of the Blemmyes to the King of the Noubades". The Journal of Egyptian Archaeology. 63: 159–170. doi:10.2307/3856316. JSTOR 3856316.
- Török, László (1984). "A Contribution to Post-meroitic Chronology: The Blemmyes in Lower Nubia". Rivista degli studi orientali. 58 (1): 201–243. JSTOR 41923344.
- Welsby, Derek A. (2002). The Medieval Kingdoms of Nubia: Pagans, Christians and Muslims along the Middle Nile. London: British Museum Press. pp. 16–17. ISBN 0-7141-1947-4.
