= Aburni =

Aburni was a king of Nobatia, who ruled around 450 AD as the successor of Silko.

Aburni is known from a letter that was found at Qasr Ibrim. The letter was written in bad Greek directed by the king of the Blemmyes, Phonen, and his son, the phylarch Breytek, to Aburni Nakase and his sons, and Mouses. This is the answer to a lost letter.

In the letter, Phonen makes it clear that he is an enemy of the Nobadians and mentions various conflicts that he had with Silko and his successor Aburni. Phonen reports that animals were exchanged for land, whereupon Silko killed the Blemmyrian phylarch Yeny and kidnapped numerous priests. It remains unclear whether Phonen got his land back. However, Phonen is the last recorded ruler of the Blemmyrians and one may assume that Aburni managed to destroy them and take over their empire.

== Literature ==
- Rea, J. (1979). "The Letter of Phonen to Aburni". Zeitschrift für Papyrologie und Epigraphik. 34: 147–162. JSTOR 20185688.
- Skeat, T. C. (1977). "A Letter from the King of the Blemmyes to the King of the Noubades". The Journal of Egyptian Archaeology. 63: 159–170. doi:10.2307/3856316. JSTOR 3856316.
- Török, László (1984). "A Contribution to Post-meroitic Chronology: The Blemmyes in Lower Nubia". Rivista degli studi orientali. 58 (1): 201–243. JSTOR 41923344.
- Welsby, Derek A. (2002). The Medieval Kingdoms of Nubia: Pagans, Christians and Muslims along the Middle Nile. London: British Museum Press. pp. 17–18. ISBN 0-7141-1947-4.
