= Temple of Kalabsha =

Building in Egypt

Coordinates: 23.6°N 32.816667°E

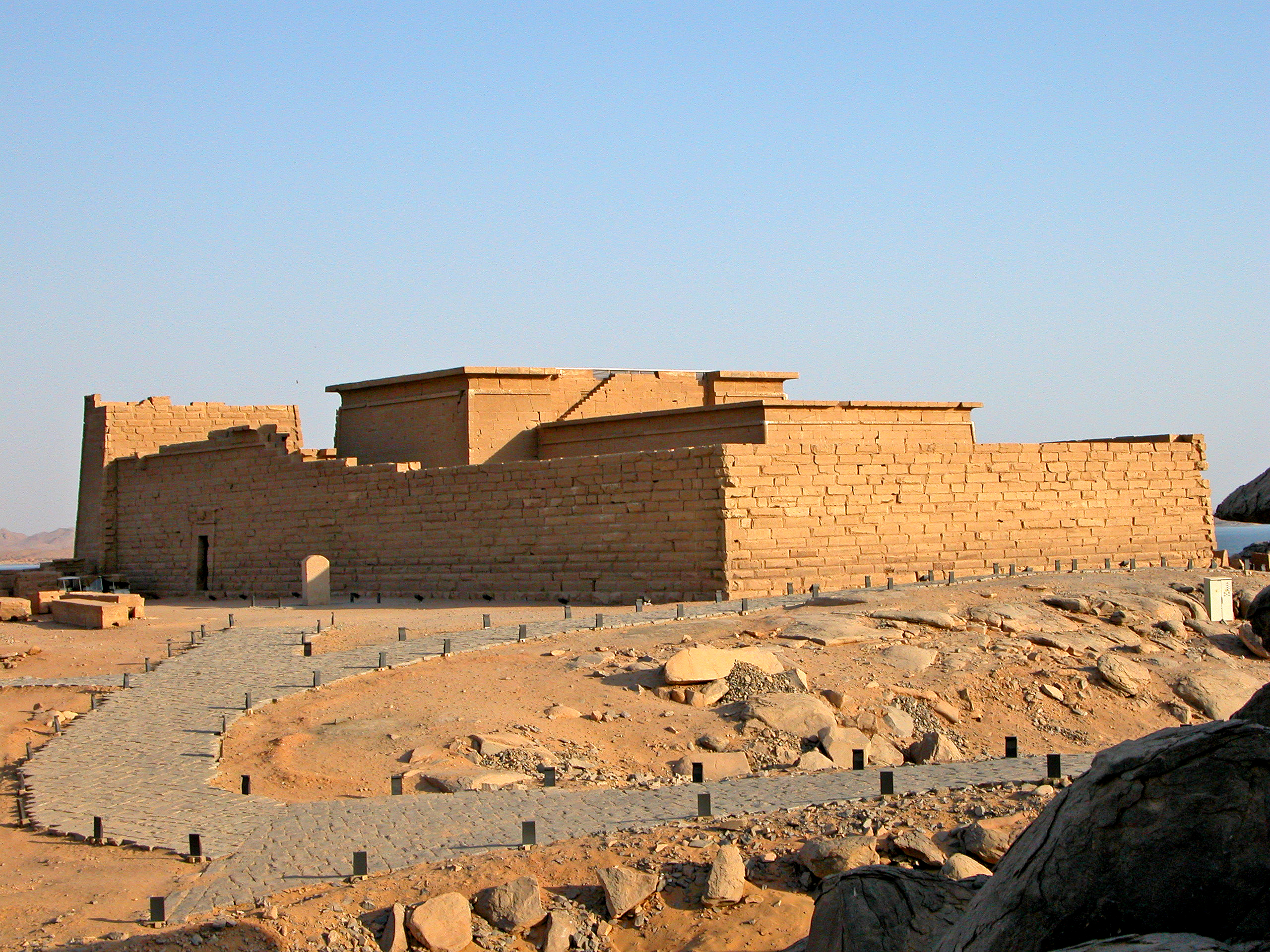
The Temple of Kalabsha in 2004

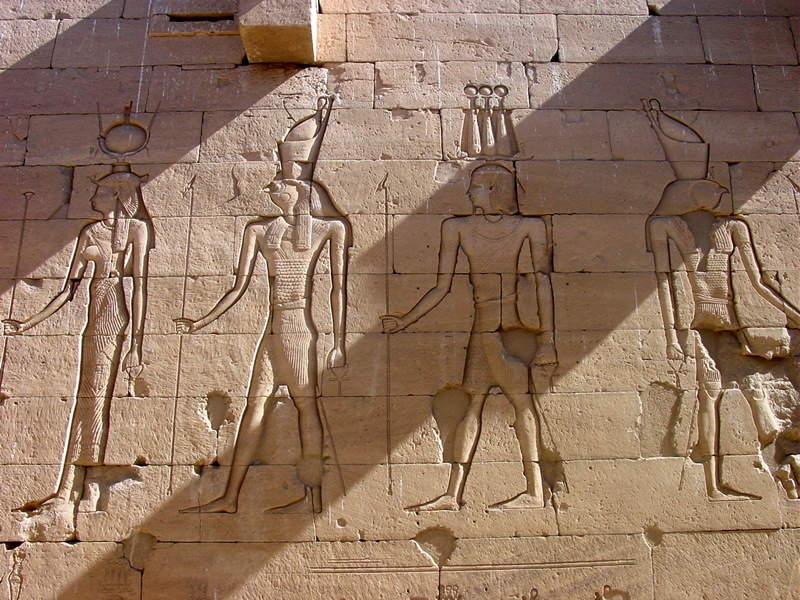
Carved relief from Kalabsha temple

The Temple of Kalabsha or Mandulis is an ancient Egyptian temple that was originally located at Bab al-Kalabsha (Gate of Kalabsha), approximately 50 km south of Aswan.

In the 1960s, in a process that took two years, the temple was relocated under the International Campaign to Save the Monuments of Nubia, and inscribed on the UNESCO World Heritage List in 1979, along with other outstanding examples of Nubian architecture including Abu Simbel and Amada.

Although the building was never completed, it "is regarded as one of the best examples of Egyptian architecture in Nubia."

== History ==
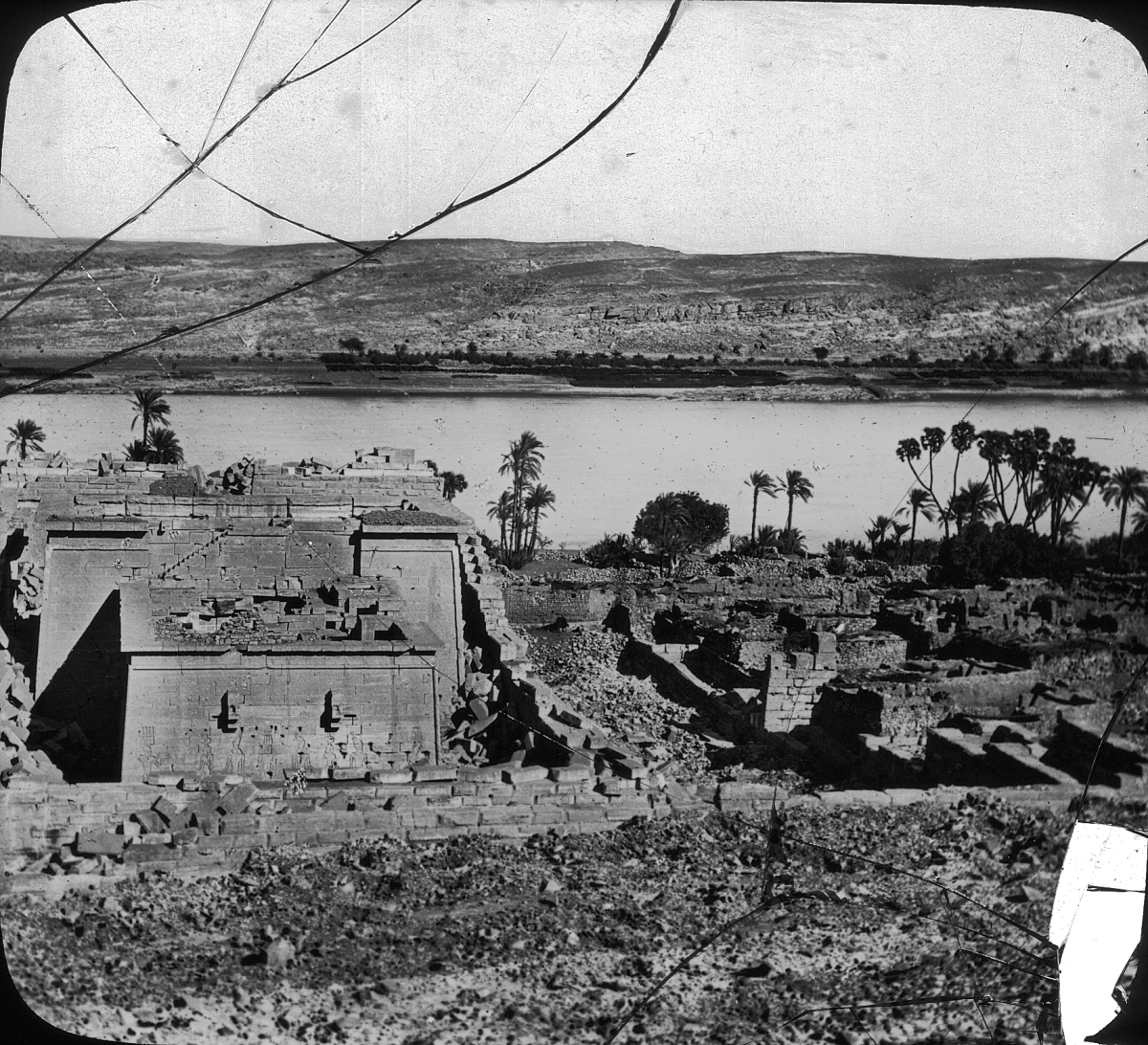
Egypt - Temple of Kalabscheh, Nubia. Brooklyn Museum Archives, Goodyear Archival Collection

The temple was situated on the west bank of the Nile River, in Nubia, and was originally built around 30 BC during the early Roman era. While the temple was constructed in Augustus's reign, it was never finished. The temple was a tribute to Mandulis (Merul), a Lower Nubian sun god. It was constructed over an earlier sanctuary built by Amenhotep II.

The temple is 76 m long and 22 m wide in dimension. While the structure dates to the Roman period, it features many fine reliefs such as "a fine carving of Horus emerging from reeds on the inner curtain wall" of the temple. From Kalabsha's "sanctuary chambers, a staircase leads up to the roof of the temple" where one can see a splendid view of the temple itself and the sacred lake.

Several historical records were inscribed on the temple walls of Kalabsha such as "a long inscription carved by the Roman Governor Aurelius Besarion in AD 250, forbidding pigs in the temple" as well as an inscription of "the Nubian king Silko, carved during the 5th century and recording his victory over the Blemmyes and a picture of him dressed as a Roman soldier on horseback." Silko was the Christian king of the Nubian kingdom of Nobatia.

Victory Stela of Kalabsha of Psammetichus II commemorates his victory over Nubia. It is now located next to the Mandulis Temple on New Kalabsha.

When Christianity was introduced to Egypt, the temple was used as a church. In 1819 the traveller Joseph de Senkowsky mentioned a variety of paintings depicting Christian saints, among them John the Baptist.

=== Movement ===
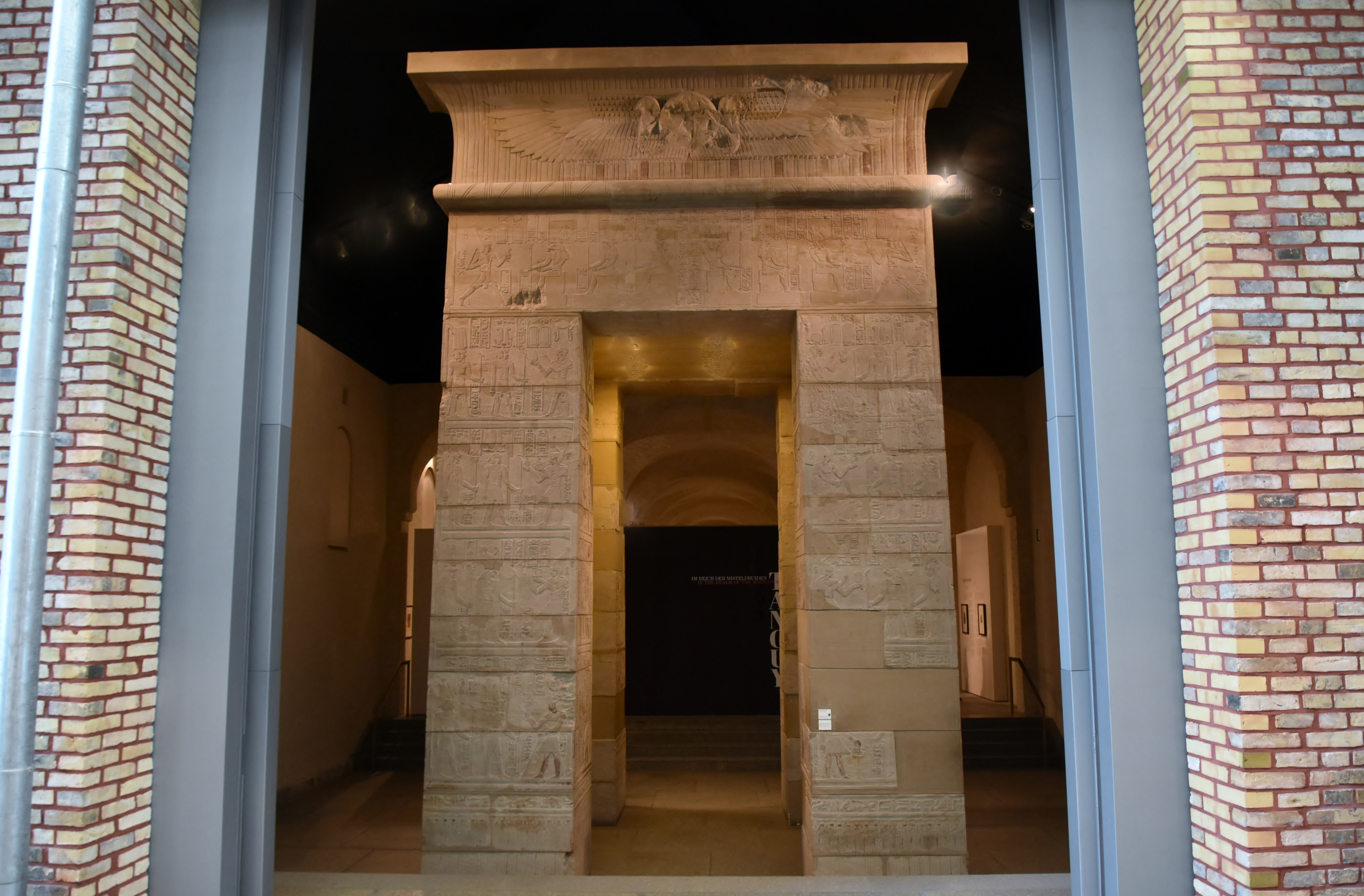
Kalabsha Gate, ca. 30 BCE, at the Egyptian Museum of Berlin, given as part of the International Campaign to Save the Monuments of Nubia

Following the Egyptian revolution of 1952 the new Egyptian regime began planning the construction of the Aswan High Dam at the Nile's first cataract (shallow rapids). The building of the dam was to result in the creation of Lake Nasser, which would submerge the banks of the Nile along its entire 479 km (298 mi) length south of the dam – flooding the entire area of historical Lower Nubia, a region that was home to 22 critical historical sites, including Kalabsha.

After UNESCO formally launched a campaign on 8 March 1960 to save the Nubian monuments West Germany decided that rather than provide money to the campaign as a whole it would instead directly fund and organize the relocation of Kalabsha. Germany's interest in making a significant contribution stemmed from its Egyptological heritage, including Lepsius' milestone work Denkmäler aus Ägypten und Äthiopien, as more specifically the work of Franz Christian Gau who had documented Kalabsha as early as 1819. The country was also keen to refurbish Germany's reputation after the events of World War II. After their offer was accepted by Egypt the West German authorities issued a contract to West Germany's largest construction company, Hochtief to determine how to undertake the work in conjunction with German archaeologists led by Hanns Stock the director of the German Archaeological Institute in Cairo. Hochtief had prior experience working in Egypt.

During the summer of 1960 engineers from Hochtief and the archaeologists began surveying the site in detail in order to determine the best way to undertake the work.

Australian George Roy Haslam (Mick) Wright was appointed by the German Archaeological Institute as the project's onsite Archaeological Manager. Wright had prior archaeological experience at Cyprus, Jericho, Malta, and Petra.

Hochtief and Stuck's archaeologists decided that the best method to move the temple was to dismantle, move and reassemble it. The relocation was complicated by the lower half of temple only being above water in July, August and September and by the site being close to the banks of the Nile. As a result it would be fully submerged as soon the Aswan High Dam was completed to a stage where filling of Lake Nasser could commence.

Hochtief was awarded the contract to undertake the relocation in August 1961. They decided that while the temple would still be underwater that because of the urgency they would commence disassembling in November, by removing what they could reach from cranes mounted on barges moored beside the structure. Unfortunately the annual Nile flood was higher than normal that year which meant that the structure was fully submerged until May 1962. To make up time the team worked in two 10-hour shifts with 450 people involved in the project working in daytime temperature ranging between 93 °F (34 °C) and 123 °F (51 °C). Each of the 13,000 blocks was uniquely numbered and its original position recorded before it was cut free and loaded onto a barge. In the process, the remaining Christian wall paintings were destroyed.

The blocks were then conveyed by barge to the new location called Khor Ingi, later renamed New Kalabsha 50 kilometres (31 mi) to the north, a journey that took four hours one way. Khor Ingi is located approximately one kilometre north of the High Dam.

Upon arrival at a specially constructed harbour and associated road the blocks were taken by truck to a temporary storage area.

Reconstruction of the temple at the new location began in October 1962 and was completed in October 1963. While work was under way news was received that lake level would rise higher than anticipated. It was soon determined that the temple’s new location was still high enough to keep it safe.

During the dismantling of the temple, blocks bearing Ptolemaic reliefs that belonged to an earlier sanctuary built by Amenhotep II were found to have been used as fill in the walls of the temple. These Ptolemaic blocks were reassembled in the 1970s on the southern tip of Elephantine Island.

The temple of Kalabsha was the largest free-standing temple of Egyptian Nubia (after Abu Simbel, which was rock-cut, not free-standing) to be moved and erected at a new site.

In 1971, Egypt gave one of the temple's gates to the Federal Republic of Germany out of gratitude for Germany’s participation in the rescue of the Nubian temples. Since 1977 the gate has been located in the annex of Berlin's Egyptian Museum in Berlin-Charlottenburg. The gate will be moved to become the monumental entrance to the fourth wing of the Pergamon Museum in Berlin, which is currently, as of 2023, being constructed.

== Gallery of images ==
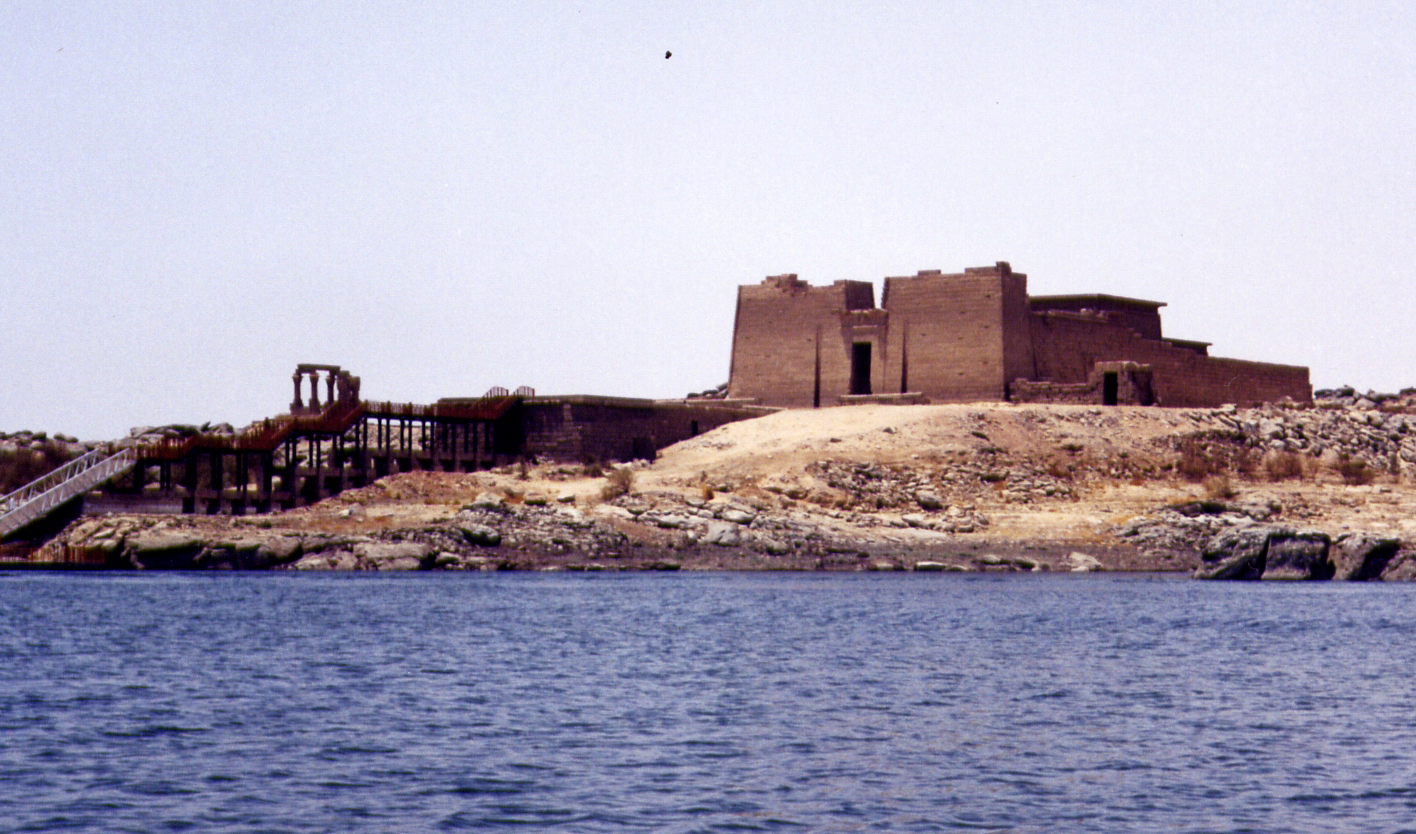
Temple of Kalabsha

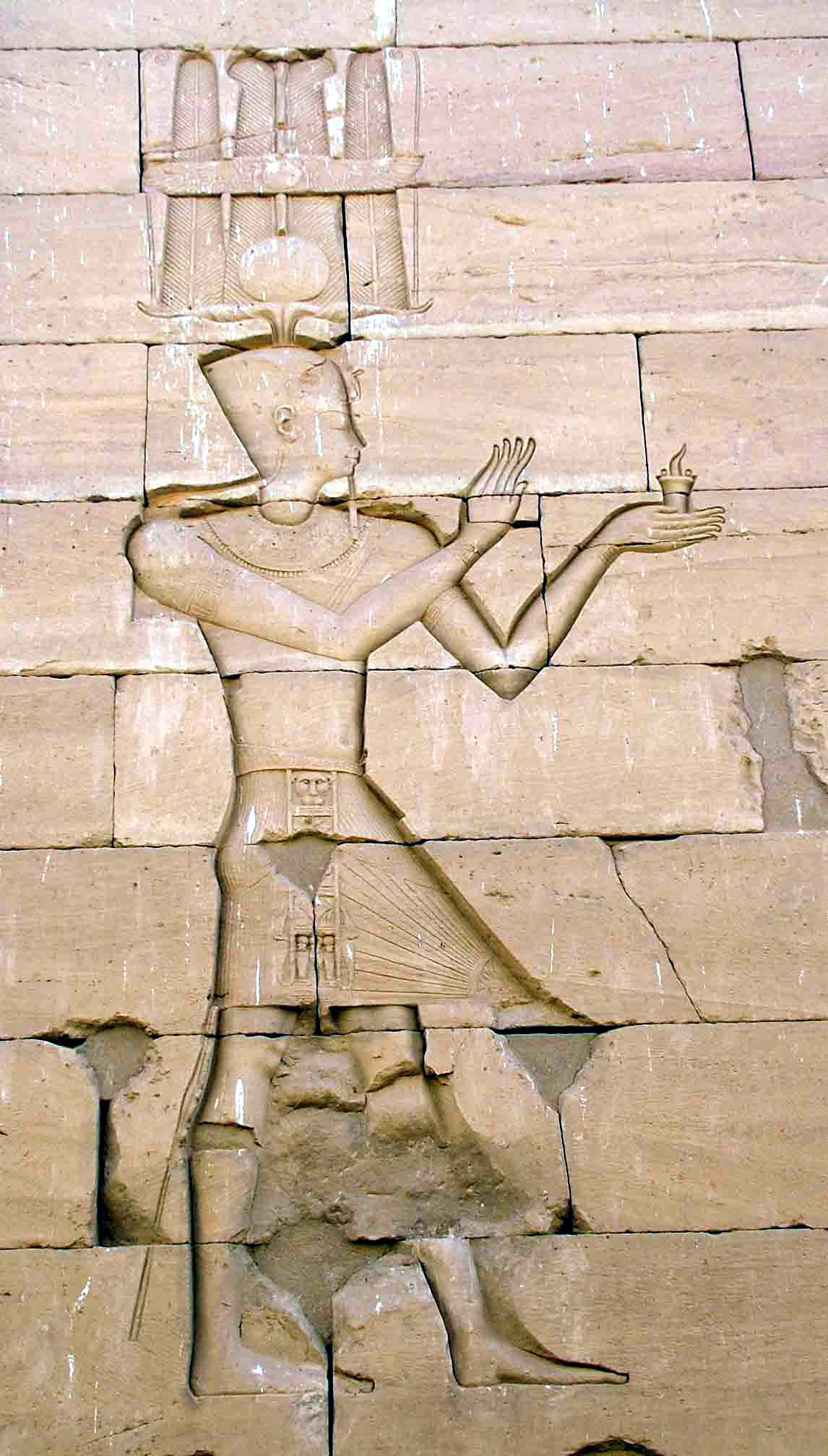
relief of Augustus at Kalabsha

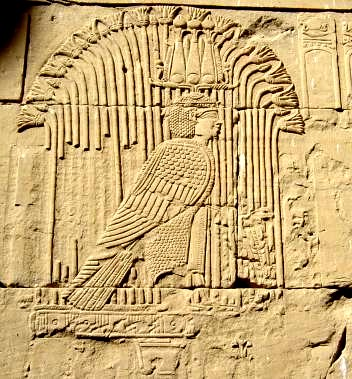
The Nubian god Mandulis from Kalabsha temple

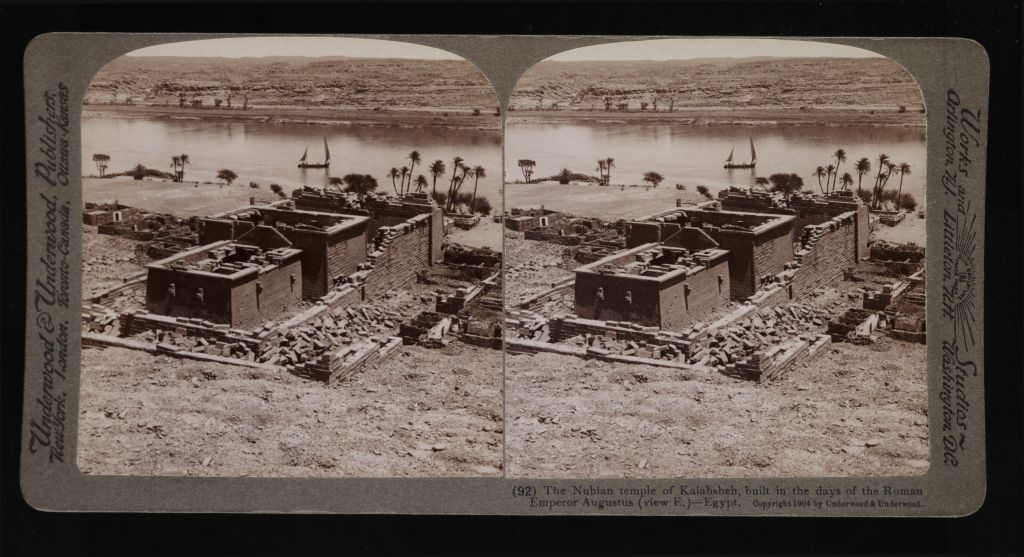
Stereo card of the temple (1904)

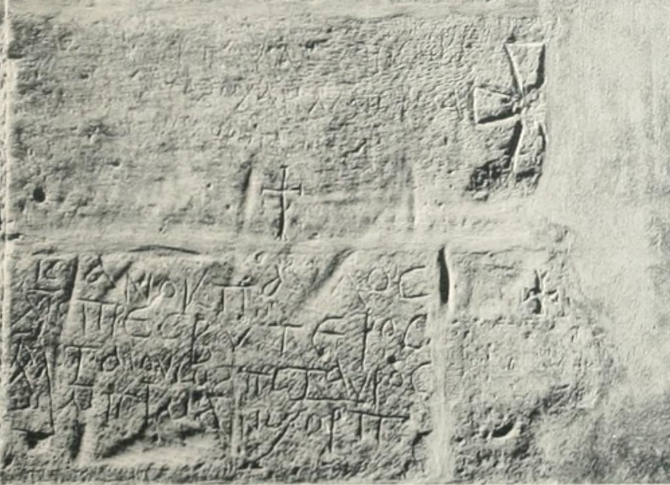
Coptic inscriptions commemorating the temple's conversion into a church

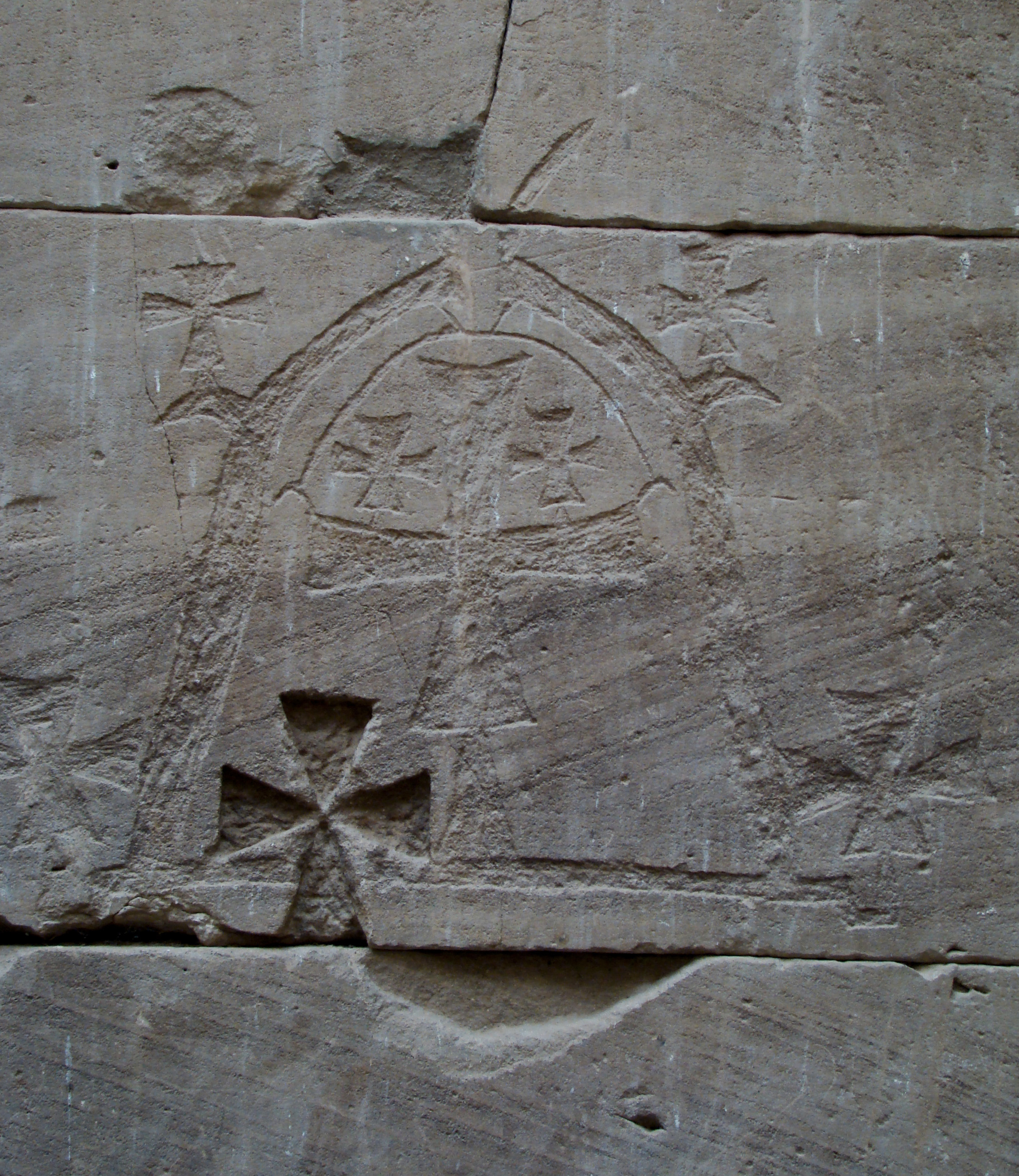
Graffiti of crosses

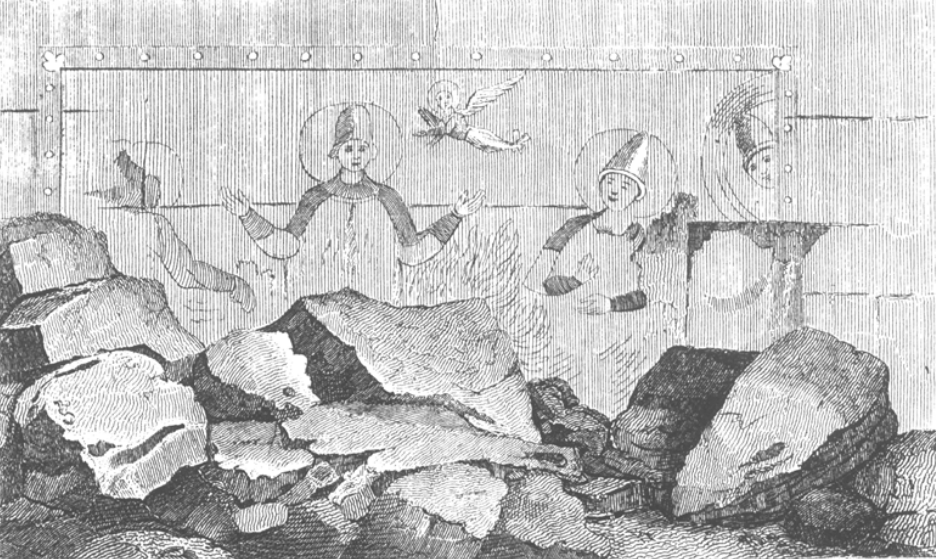
19th-century sketch of a Christian wall painting

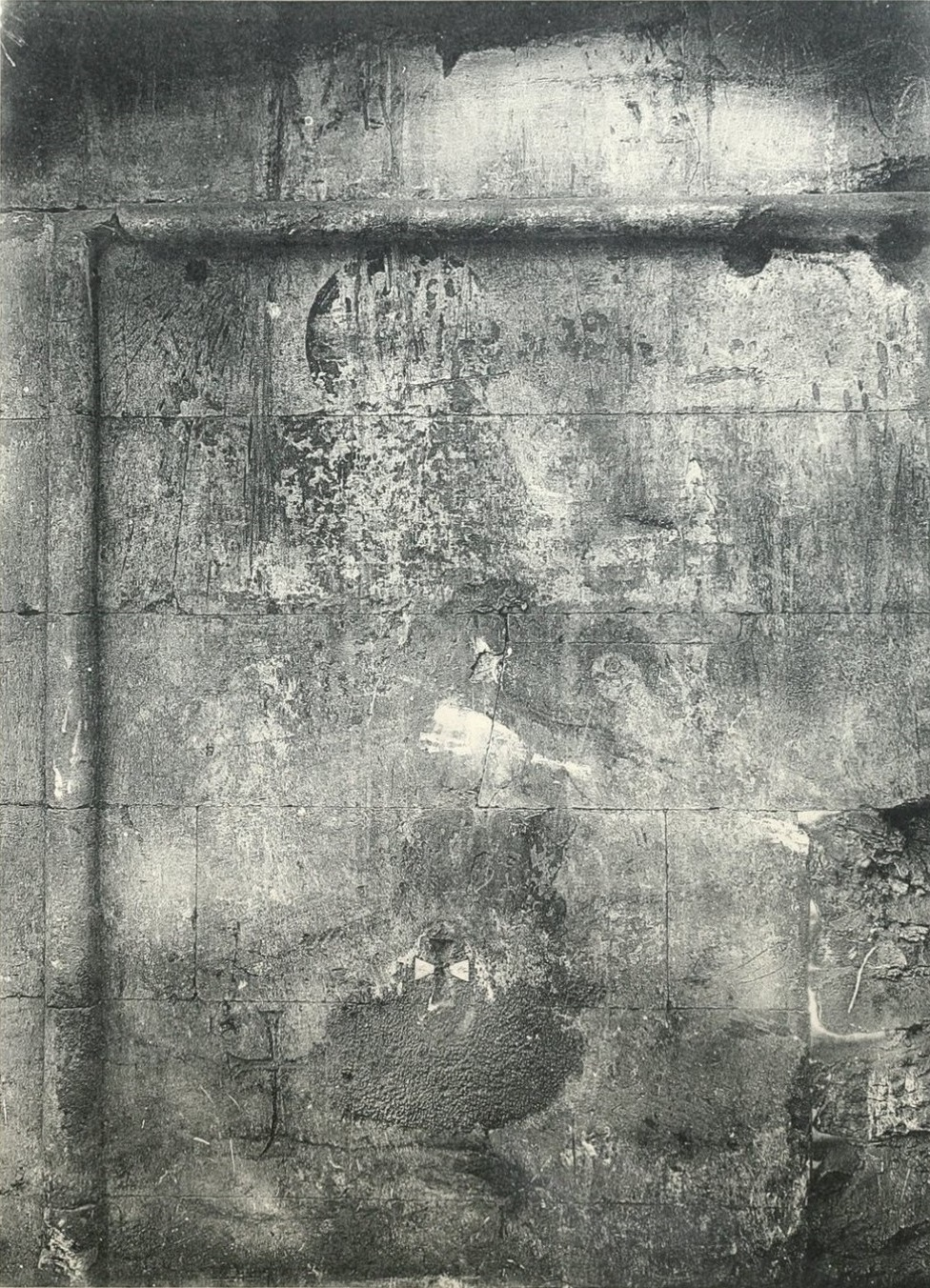
Photo of a Christian wall painting from 1911

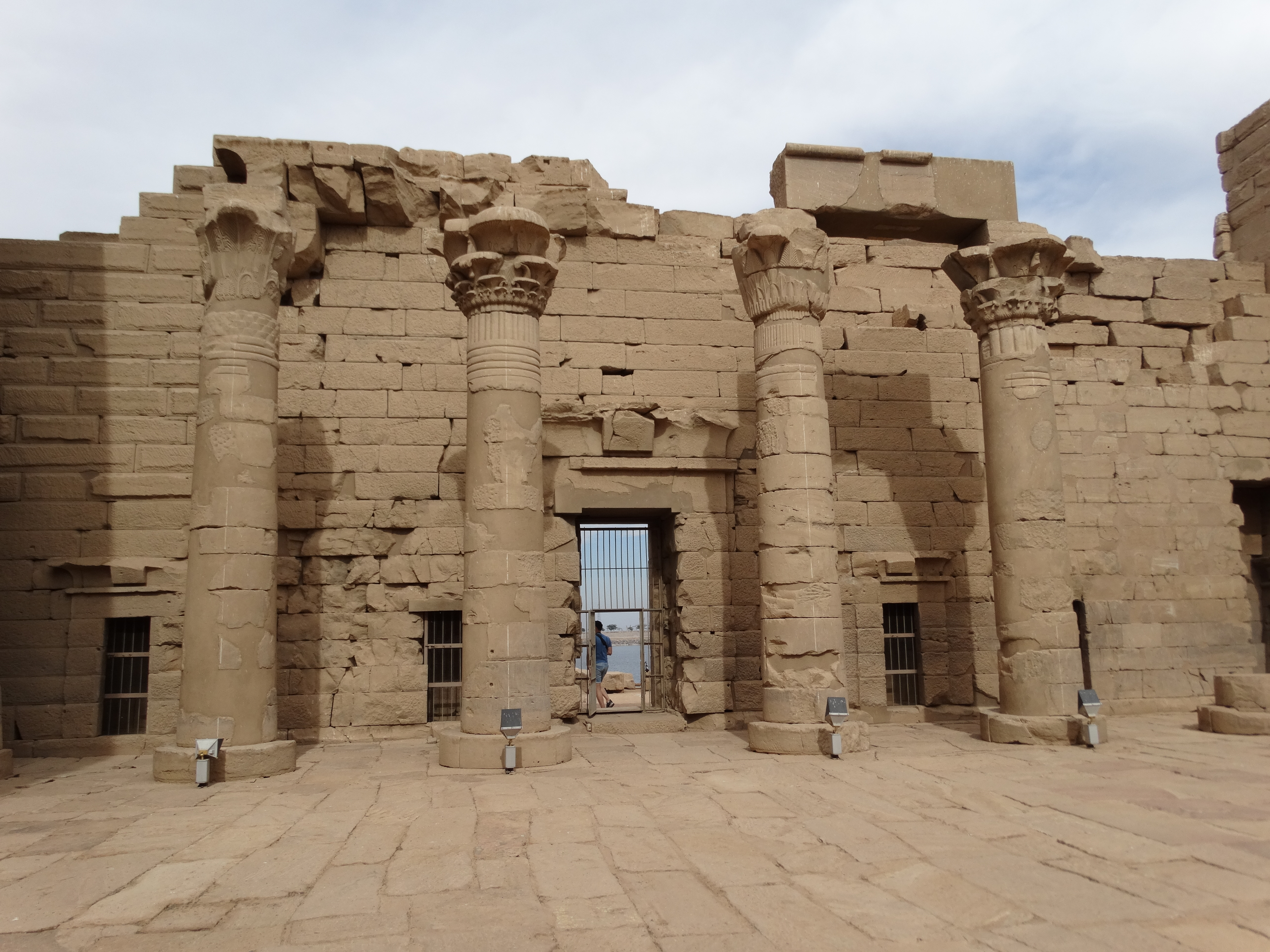
View of the main gate from inside

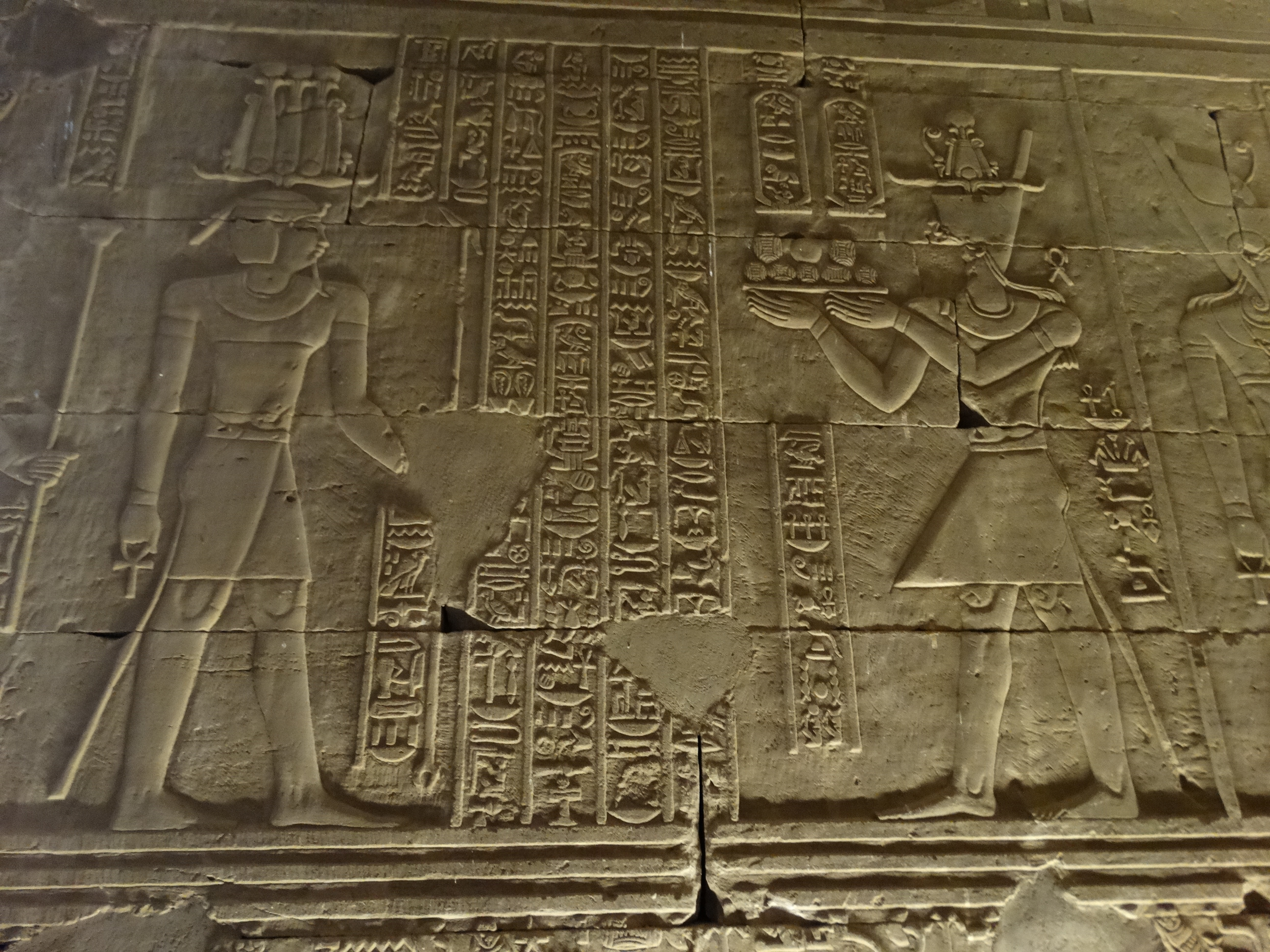
Relief on the walls of the temple

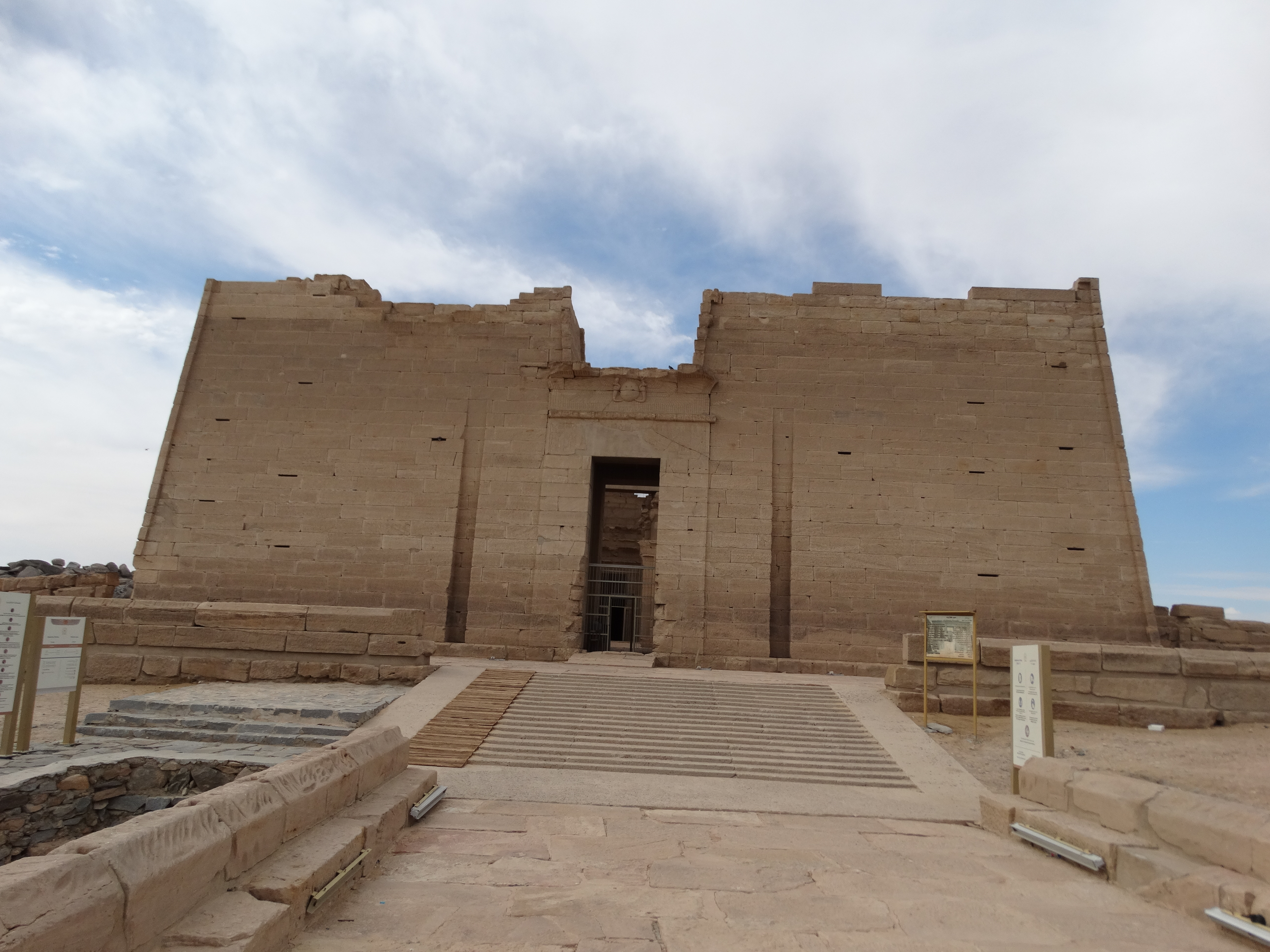
Kalabsha - main pilon

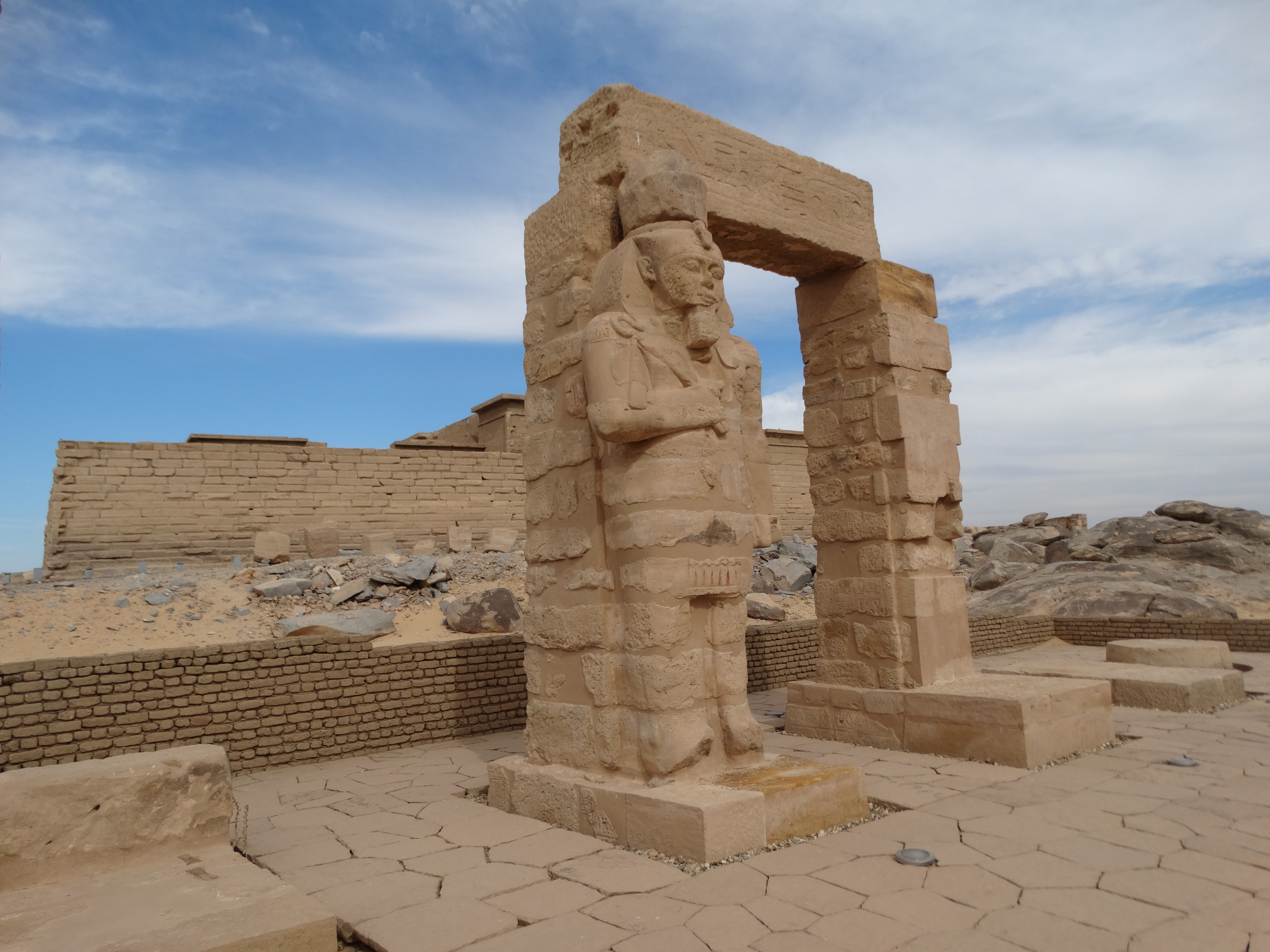
Remains of Gerf Hussein sculptures close to the temple

== See also ==
- Nubian architecture

== Bibliography ==
- Arnold, Dieter (1975). Die Tempel von Kalabscha (in German). Cairo: Deutsches Archäologisches Institut, Abteilung Kairo.
- Olson, Lynne (2023). Empress of the Nile: The Daredevil Archaeologist Who Saved Egypt's Ancient Temples from Destruction (Softcover). Brunswick, Australia: Scribe House. ISBN 978-1-922585-99-8.
- Peters, Erin. A (2015). Egypt in empire: Augustan temple art and architecture at Karnak, Philae, Kalabsha, Dendur, and Alexandria (Doctor of Philosophy). University of Iowa.
- Wilkinson, Richard H. (2000). The Complete Temples of Ancient Egypt (Hardcover). London: Thames & Hudson. ISBN 978-0500051009.
- Stock, Hanns; Siegler, Karl Georg (1965). Kalabsha. Der größte Tempel Nubiens und das Abenteuer seiner Rettung (in German). Wiesbaden: F. A. Brockhaus.
- Wright, George R. (1972). Kalabsha. The Preserving of the Temple. Berlin: Gebr, Mann Verlag. ISBN 3-7861-2186-9.
- Wright, George R. (1987). The Ptolemaic Sanctuary of Kalabsha. Its Reconstruction on Elephantine Island. Mainz: P. von Zabern. ISBN 3-8053-0892-2.
