= Dotawo =

Kingdom in Lower Nubia

Coordinates: 22°17′50″N 31°38′13″E

Kingdom of Dotawo
- Late 14 century–Early 17th century
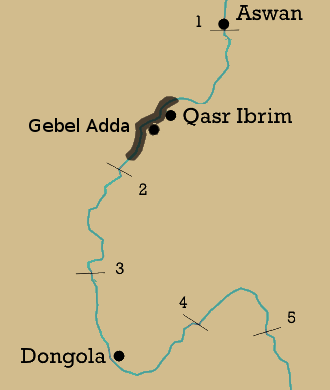
- Minimum extension of Dotawo
- Capital: Daw (city)
- Common languages: Old Nubian
- Religion: Coptic Christianity
- Government: Monarchy
- History
  - Established: Late 14 century
  - Disestablished: Early 17th century

Dotawo was a Christian kingdom in Lower Nubia (northern Sudan and southern Egypt) in the Middle Ages. It is attested in Old Nubian documents from the 12th to the 15th centuries. It is one of the last attested Christian states to survive in the region.

== Etymology ==
Two proposals explain the etymology of the name of Dotawo. The first sees the name as an Old Nubian term meaning "Lower Daw" or the region "Below Daw"), pointing to the Old Nubian suffix -tauo ("under") and the toponym "Daw," widely known from Arabic histories of Christian Nubia. The second sees the name as a calque for the old Egyptian term "Upper and Lower Egypt," proposing a combination of the Old Nubian suffixes -do ("upon") and -tauo ("under").

== History ==
Modern understanding of the history of Dotawo has evolved considerably in recent generations. It had been generally held that Dotawo was one of a number of small successor states to emerge during the prolonged collapse of central government in the Christian kingdom of Makuria. A brief mention in the work of the medieval Egyptian historian al-Maqrīzī was taken to indicate that prolonged fighting for control over the capital city, Dongola, devastated that city and compelled the Nubian court to move to Daw, which some modern scholars believed to be modern Gebel Adda, in 1364/65. Under the first etymology of the term "Dotawo" discussed above, it might then be the Nubian state as it survived from its new capital at Daw. Even in earlier periods, prior to the collapse of Dongola, Arab writers report that Nubia was structured with thirteen lesser kings under one "Great King," and Dotawo could have been one of these vassal kingdoms.

The large collection of Old Nubian documents found at Qasr Ibrim in the 1960s pose considerable problems for this view. The texts from Qasr Ibrim show the Eparch of Nobatia (northern Nubian) to be subordinate to the King of Dotawo during Makuria's peak in the 12th century. One explanation for this is that Dotawo is simply another name for Makuria. The depiction of multiple Nubian kings conflicts with the description of the region given by Arab traveler Ibn Selim el-Aswani. In no known document are the names of both Dotawo and Makuria present, and at several points the listed names of the king of Dotawo matches those of Makuria. The first generation of scholars to study the Qasr Ibrim finds found too many apparent conflicts between the names of the kings of Makuria and the kings of Dotawo to be satisfied with this explanation. Later study and re-editing of these texts resolved most of these apparent conflicts, and it now seems likely that "Dotawo" is the indigenous name for the central state of Nubia from at least its first attestation in the 1180s to its last attestation in the 1490s; by 2022, this position was accepted as the scholarly consensus. In 2021, it was suggested that the name "Dotawo" appears so late in the history of Christian Nubia because it referred specifically to the unified kingdom of Makuria and Alodia after a personal union between their royal families in the eleventh century.

The end of Dotawo has traditionally been placed around the year 1500, at which point it is thought to have been conquered by the Funj Sultanate, founded in 1504. However, in 2023 Adam Simmons pointed to overlooked evidence in Terceira Década da Ásia by the Portuguese historian João de Barros for the existence in the 1520s of a Christian Nubian queen who de Barros called Gaua, and suggested that Dotawo continued as an independent polity between the Ottomans to the North and the Funj to the south into the seventeenth century.

== See also ==
- Joel of Dotawo
