= Silko =

- King of Nobatia and all Aethiopia
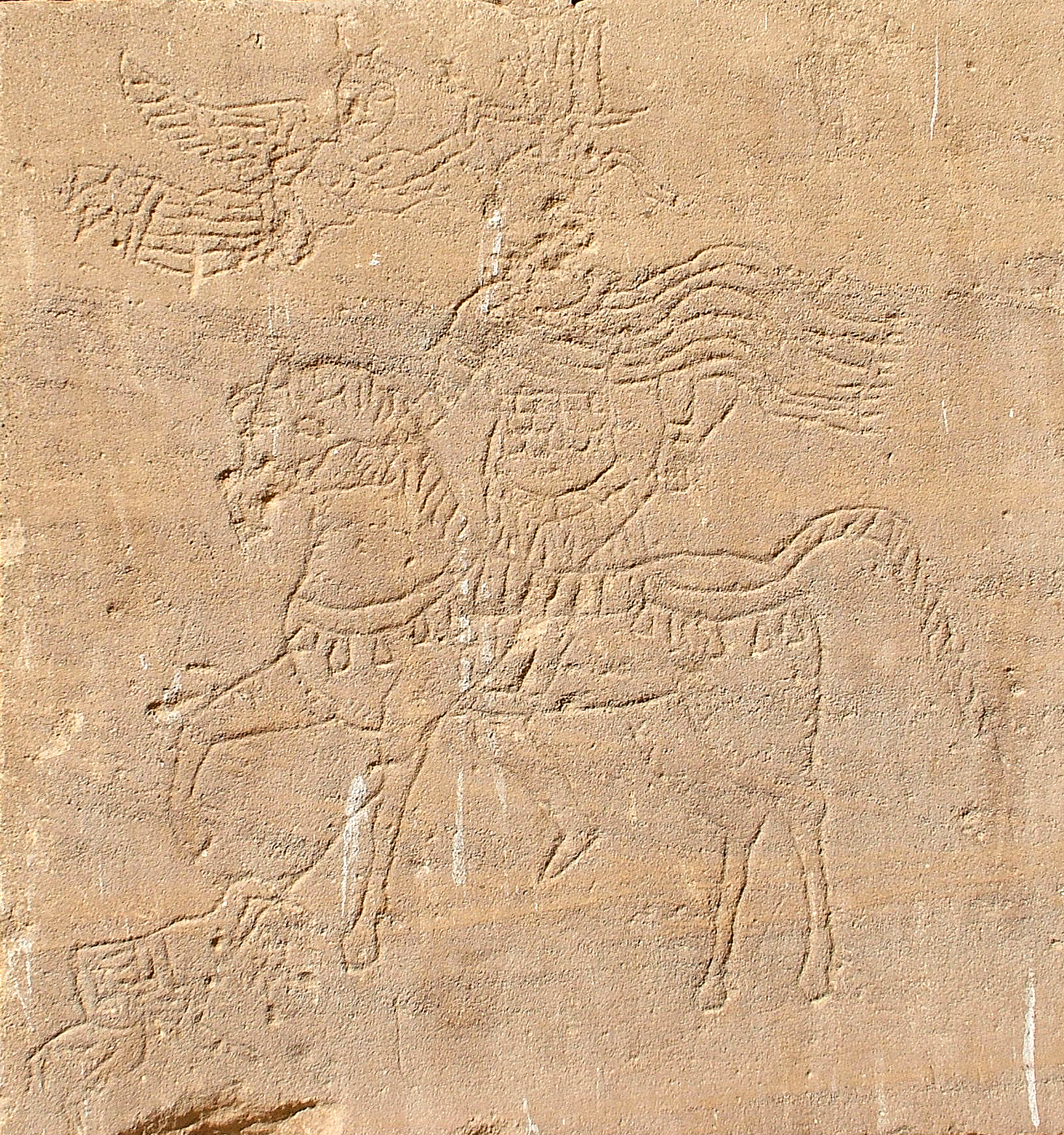
- Graffito from the Temple of Kalabsha (Talmis), depicting king Silko on horse back spearing an enemy

King of Nobatia
- Reign: c. 5th century
- Successor: Aburni
- Born: Faras
- Religion: Coptic Orthodox Christianity

Silko (Ancient Greek: Σιλκω) was ruler of the Nubian kingdom of Nobatia. He is known for uniting Nobatia and being the first Nubian king to adopt Christianity.

During Silko's reign Nobatia defeated the Blemmyes to the North, and an inscription by Silko at the Temple of Kalabsha claims to have driven the Blemmyes into the Eastern Desert. The inscription on the temple was made in Greek suggesting that he was influenced by Byzantine culture. He established Pakhoras (now Faras) as his capital. Nobatia officially converted to Coptic Orthodox Christianity under his reign..

It is believed he was buried in Ballana.
