= Nobatia =

Medieval kingdom in Lower Nubia

Nobatia ⲙⲓⲅⲛ̅ ⲙⲓⲅⲓⲧⲛ︦ ⲅⲟⲩⲗ
- c. 400–7th century
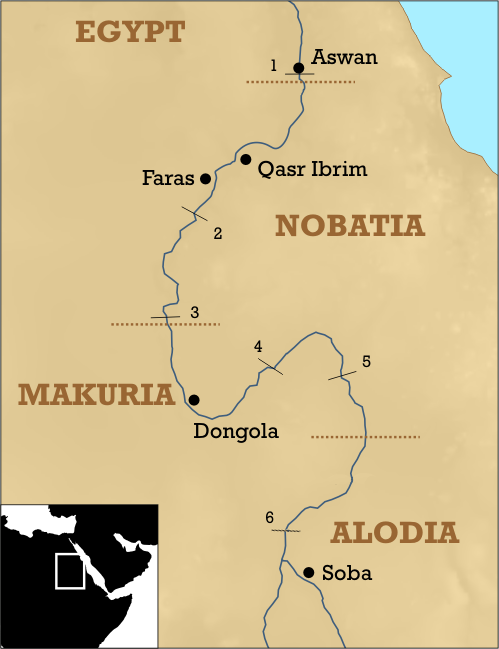
- Nobatia and the other Christian Nubian kingdoms.
- Capital: Pachoras
- Common languages: Nubian; Greek; Coptic
- Religion: Isis cult Coptic Orthodox Christianity (From 543)
- Government: Monarchy
- King of Nobatia
  - 450 A.D: Silko (first known king)
- Historical era: Late Antiquity/Early Middle Ages
  - Established: c. 400
  - Integrated into Makuria: 7th century
Preceded by	Succeeded by
Kingdom of Kush	Makuria
- Today part of: Sudan; Egypt

Nobatia /noʊˈbeɪʃə/ or Nobadia (/noʊˈbeɪdiə/; Greek: Νοβαδία, Nobadia; Old Nubian: ⲙⲓⲅⲛ̅ Migin or ⲙⲓⲅⲓⲧⲛ︦ ⲅⲟⲩⲗ, Migitin Goul lit. "of Nobadia's land") was a late antique kingdom in Lower Nubia, modern day southern Egypt. Together with the two other Coptic-Nubian kingdoms, Makuria and Alodia, it succeeded the kingdom of Kush. After its establishment in around 400, Nobadia gradually expanded by defeating the Blemmyes in the north and incorporating the territory between the second and third Nile cataract in the south. In 543, it converted to Coptic Christianity. It would then be annexed by Makuria, under unknown circumstances, during the 7th century.

== History ==
The kingdom of Nobatia had been founded in the former Meroitic province of Akine, which comprised large parts of Lower Nubia and is speculated to have been autonomous already before the ultimate fall of the Kingdom of Kush in the mid 4th century.

While the Nobatae /ˈnɒbəti/ had been invited into the region from the Western Desert by the Roman Emperor Diocletian in 297 AD, their kingdom only became tangible around 400 AD. Early Nobatia is quite likely the same civilization that is known to archeologists as the Ballana culture.

Eventually, the Nobatae were successful in defeating the Blemmyes, and an inscription by Silko, "Basiliskos" of the Nobatae, claims to have driven the Blemmyes into the Eastern Desert. Around this time the Nobatian capital was established at Pakhoras (modern Faras); soon after, Nobatia converted to non-Chalcedonian Christianity.

By 707, Nobatia had been annexed by their southern neighbor, Makuria. The circumstances of this merger are unknown. It is also unknown what happened to the Nobadian royal family. The merger most likely occurred before the Muslim conquest in 652, since the Arab histories speak of only one Christian state in Nubia and reached at least as far as Old Dongola. Nobatia seems to have maintained some autonomy in the new state. It was ruled by an eparch of Nobatia who was also titled the Domestikos of Pakhoras. These were originally appointed but seem to be dynastic in the later period. Some of their records have been found at Fort Ibrim, presenting a figure with a great deal of power.

Nobatia՚s name is often given as al-Maris in Arabic histories. The eparchate of Nobadia remained an integral part of the Kingdom of Makuria until Makuria's end, as is confirmed by a document from 1463 mentioning an eparch named Teedderre.

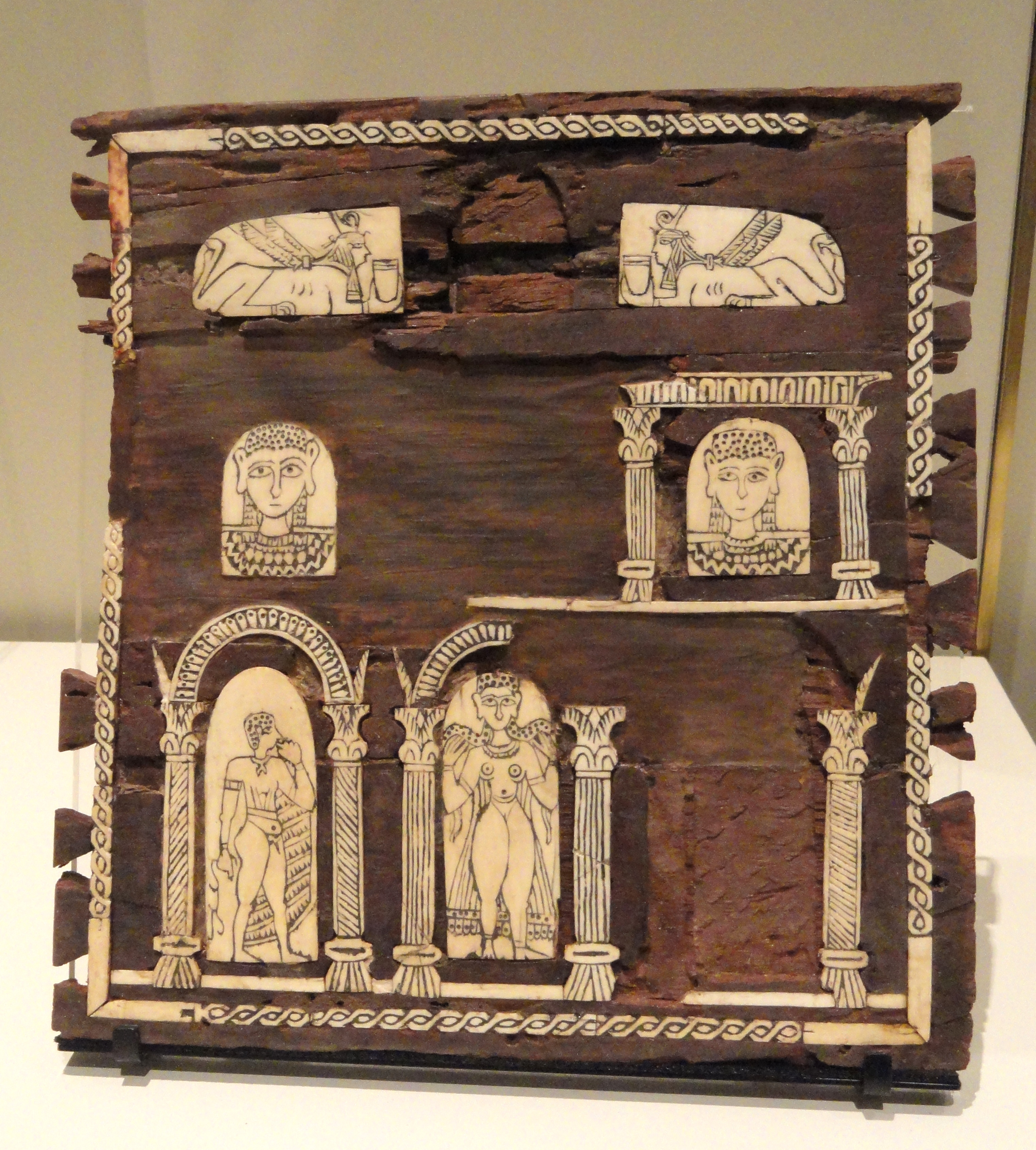
Wooden casket with ivory inlays, Jebel Adda (4th century)

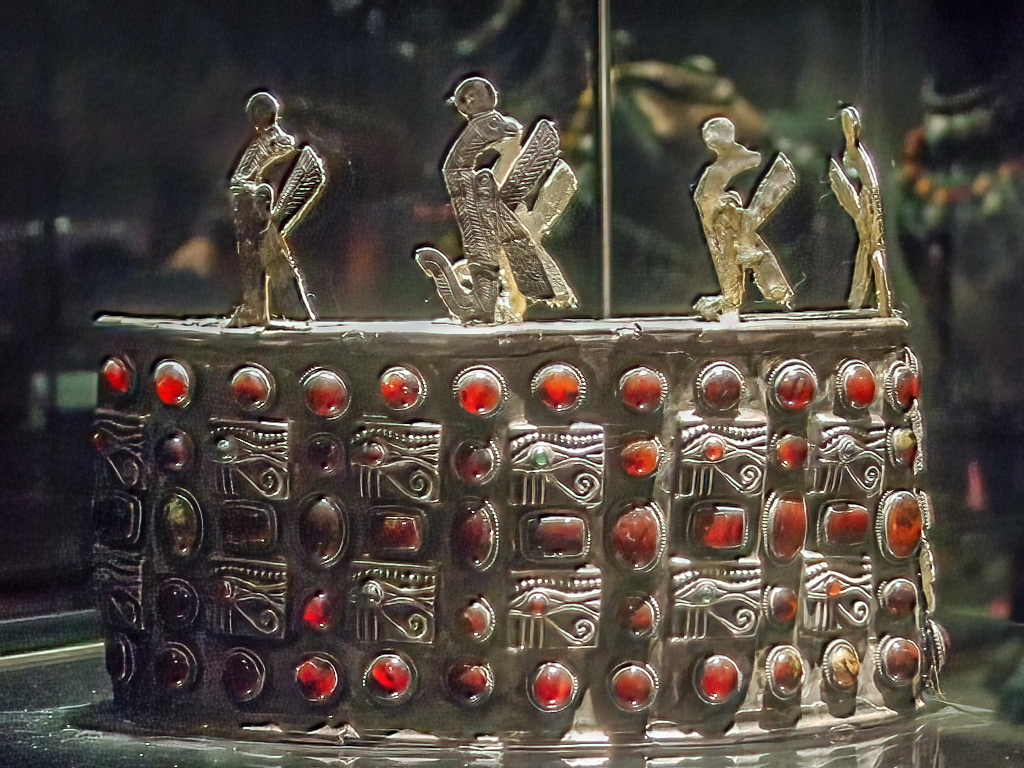
Royal crown discovered in Ballana (5th century)

== Religion ==
=== Paganism ===
Since Ptolemaic times, the "state religion" of Lower Nubia had been the Isis cult of Philae. Its importance outlived the Ptolemaic and Meroitic period and Nubian pilgrims continued to travel to Philae. The temple on Philae was eventually shut down between 535 and 538 and Nubians were forbidden to enter. Another Isis cult, the Greco-Roman mysteries of Isis, has been confirmed to be practised in Nobadia by an unearthed shrine in Qasr Ibrim. This cult was practised during Meroitic times as well.

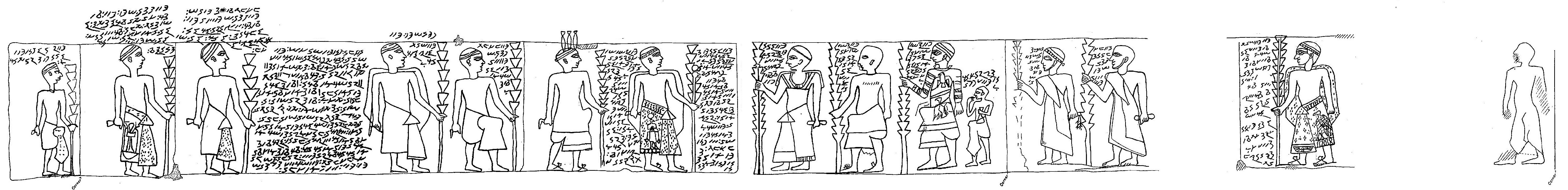
Reliefs of the "Ethiopian" chamber inside the Isis temple of Philae, depicting pilgrims and priests from the south. The inscription in front of the third figure from the left is a letter describing the gifts of a diplomatic mission sent by King Talakhidamani of Kush.

=== Christianity ===
As confirmed by epigraphical and archaeological evidence, Christianity was already present among parts of the Nobadian society even before the official conversion of 543. The Nobadian elite might have started considering to convert to Christianity in the 530s, parallel to when the Isis temple was shut down. Christianity proceeded to spread through Nobadia on various levels at different speeds. Towns, for example, were quick in adopting the new religion, while the Christianization of the villages was not accomplished until the 7th–9th centuries. South of the second cataract, Christianity seems to have begun spreading later than in the north, possibly since the late 6th or early 7th century. Many ancient Egyptian temples were converted to churches and plastered with Christian wall paintings.

Gallery

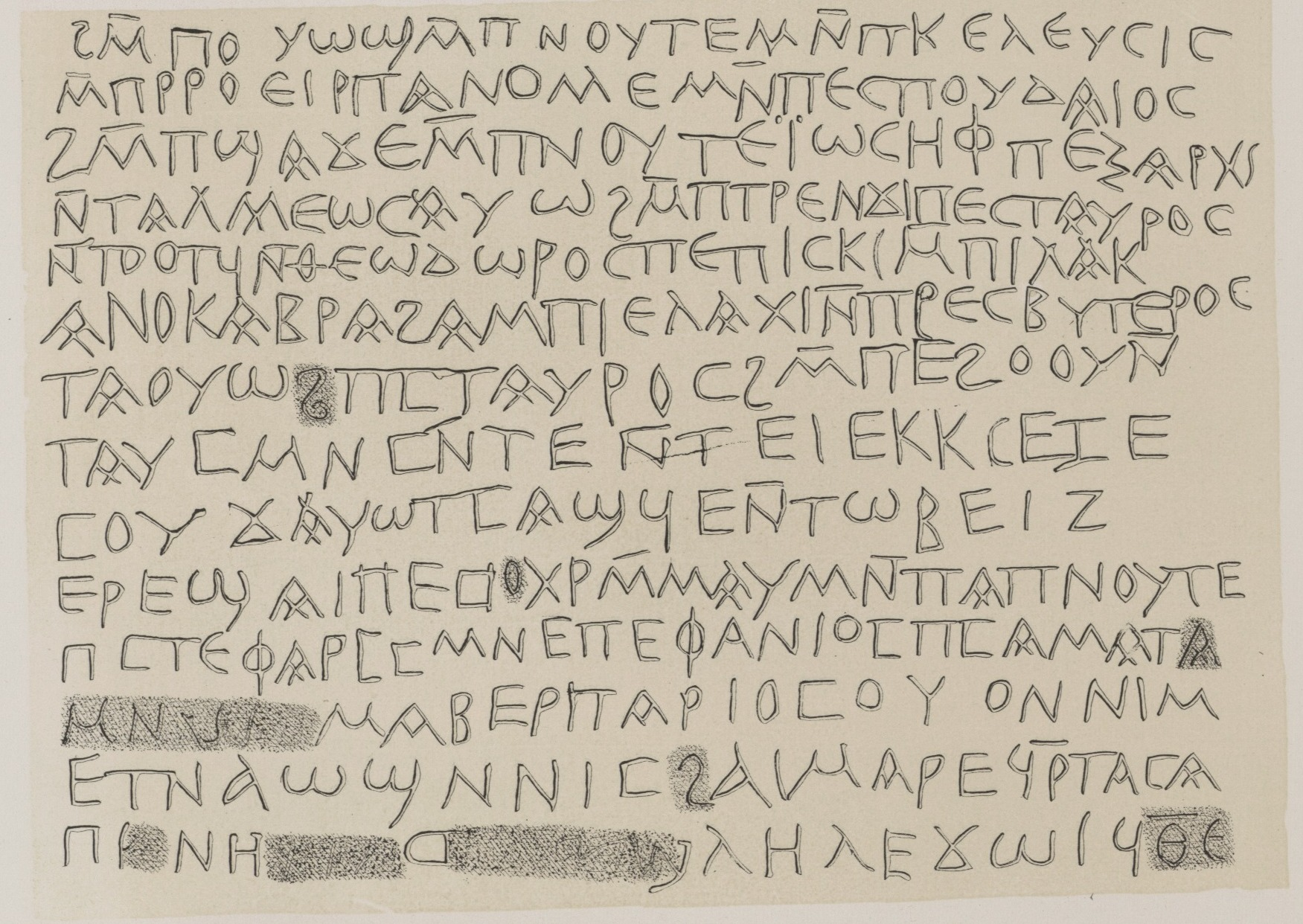
Copy of a Coptic inscription in the Temple of Dendur, commemorating the conversion of the temple into a church during the reign of king Eirpanome (mid-6th century)

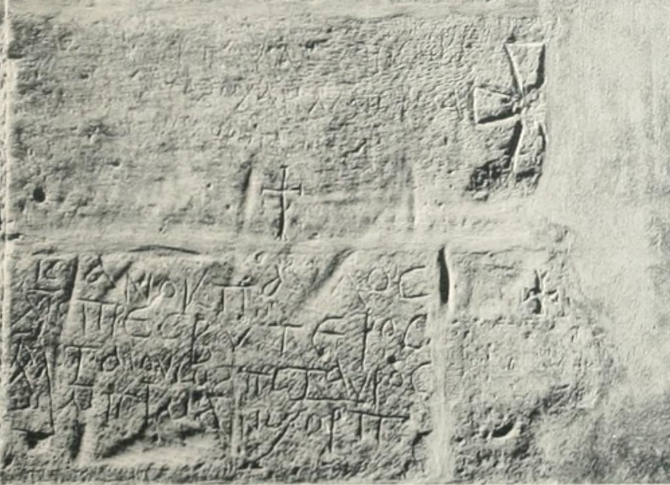
Coptic inscriptions in the Temple of Kalabsha commemorating its conversion into a church by a certain bishop Paul

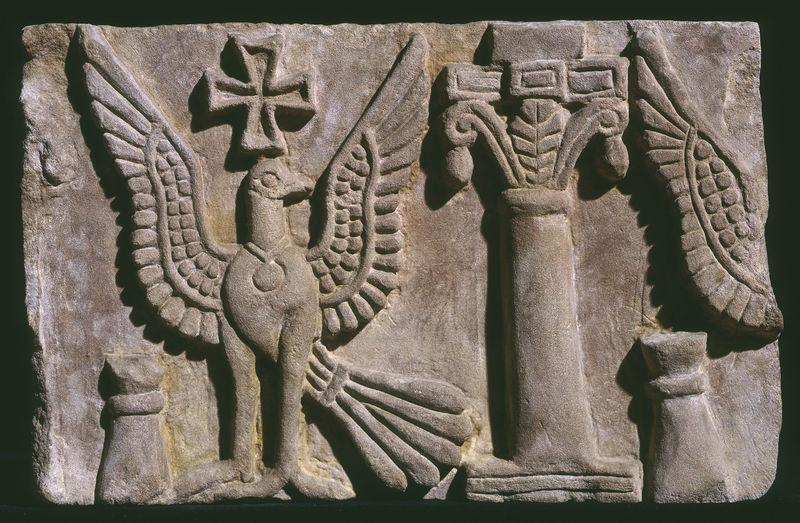
Early-7th-century frieze fragment of the Faras cathedral

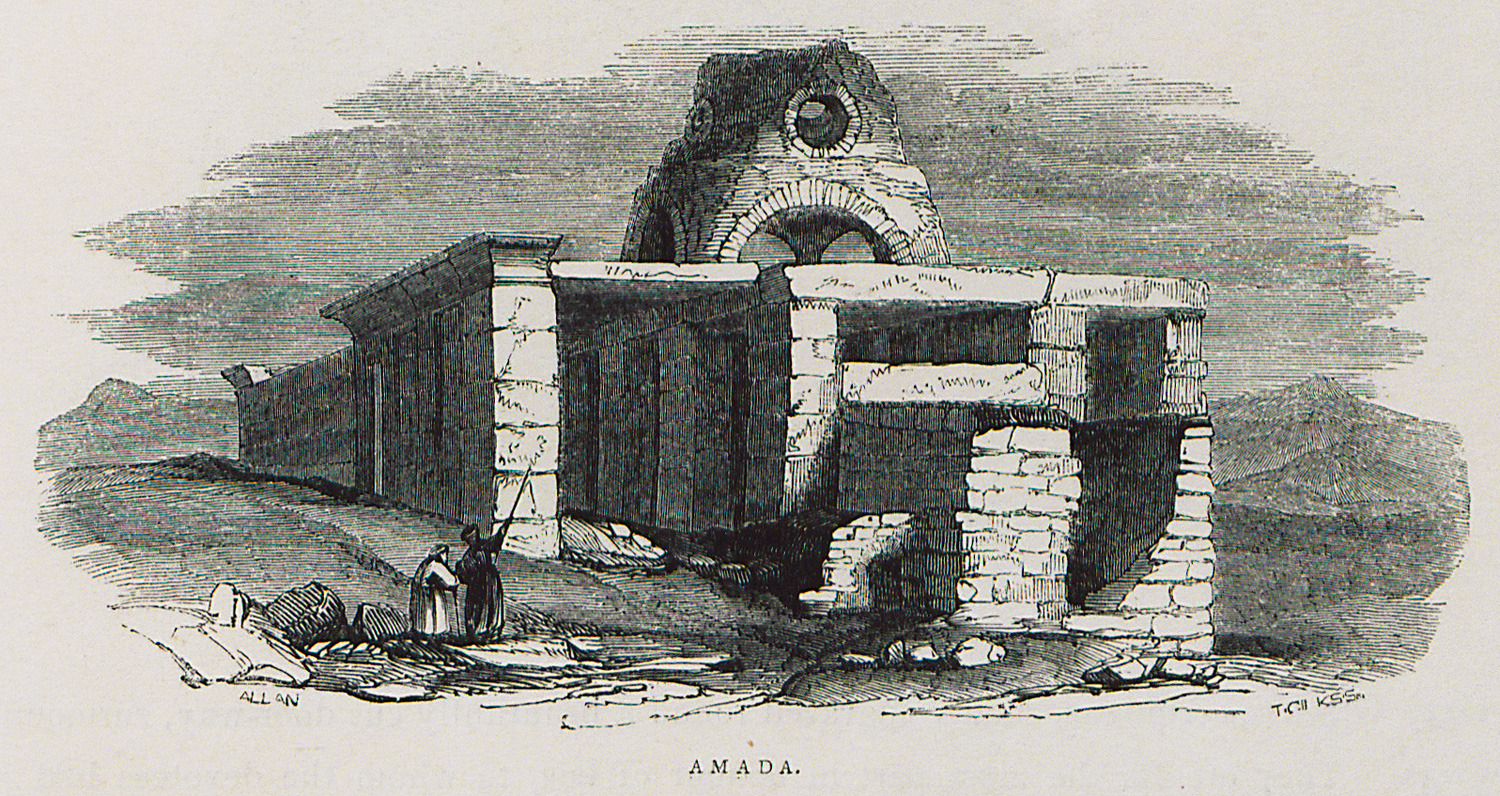
The converted Temple of Amada with the now-demolished Christian dome

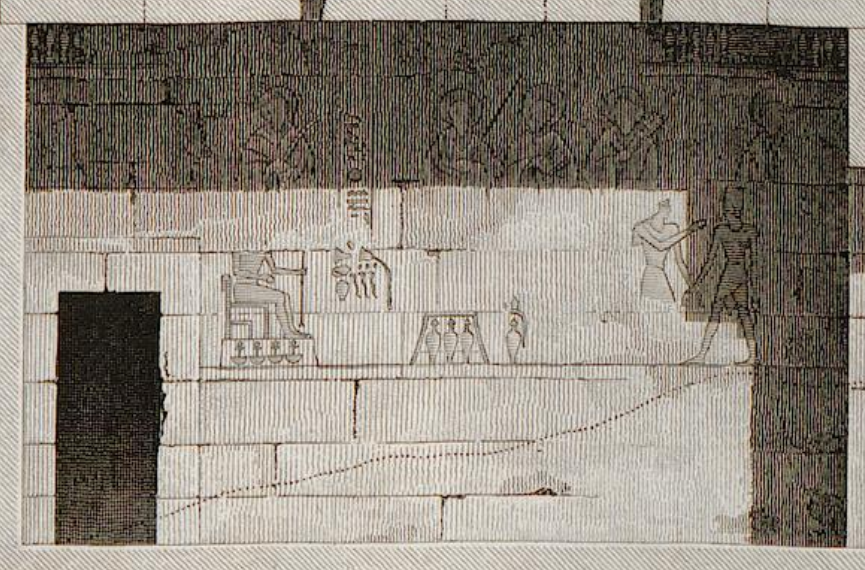
Damaged paintings of Christian saints inside the temple of Amada

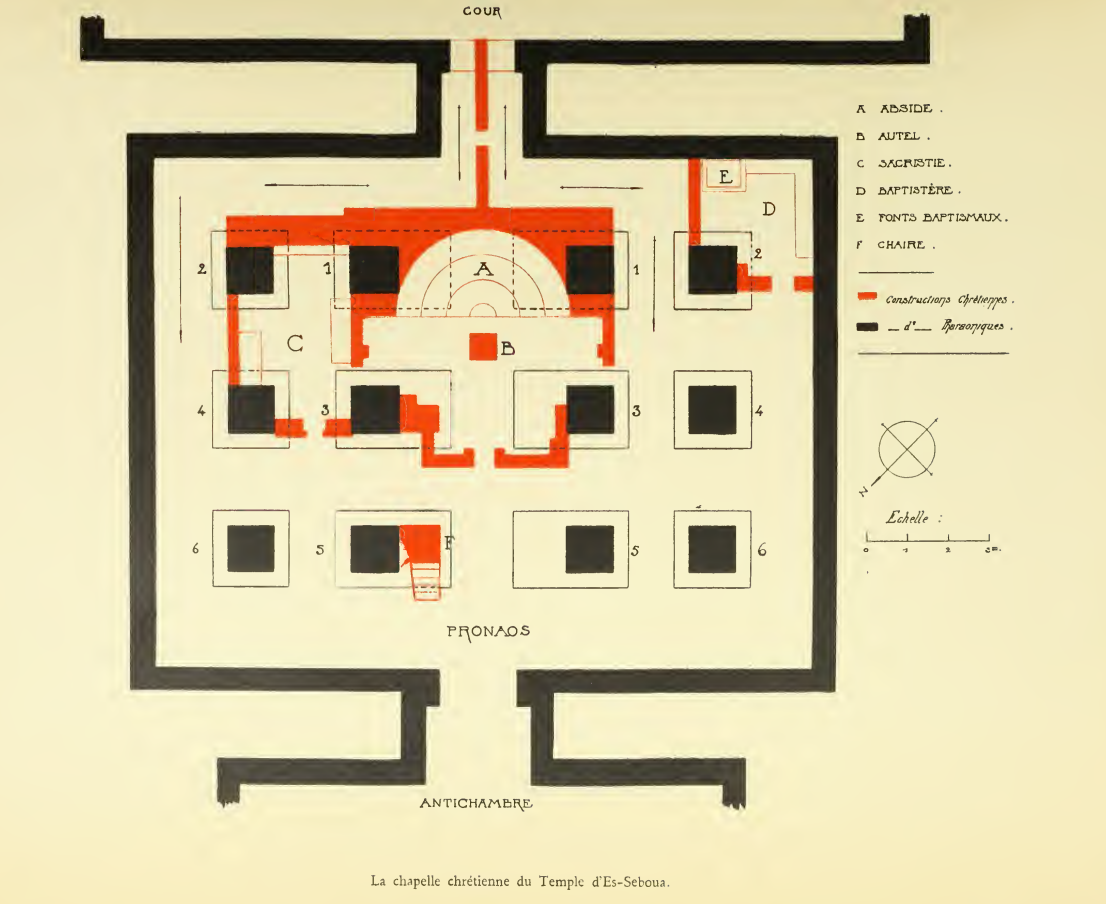
Plan of the Christian church (red) inserted into the temple of Wadi es-Sebua

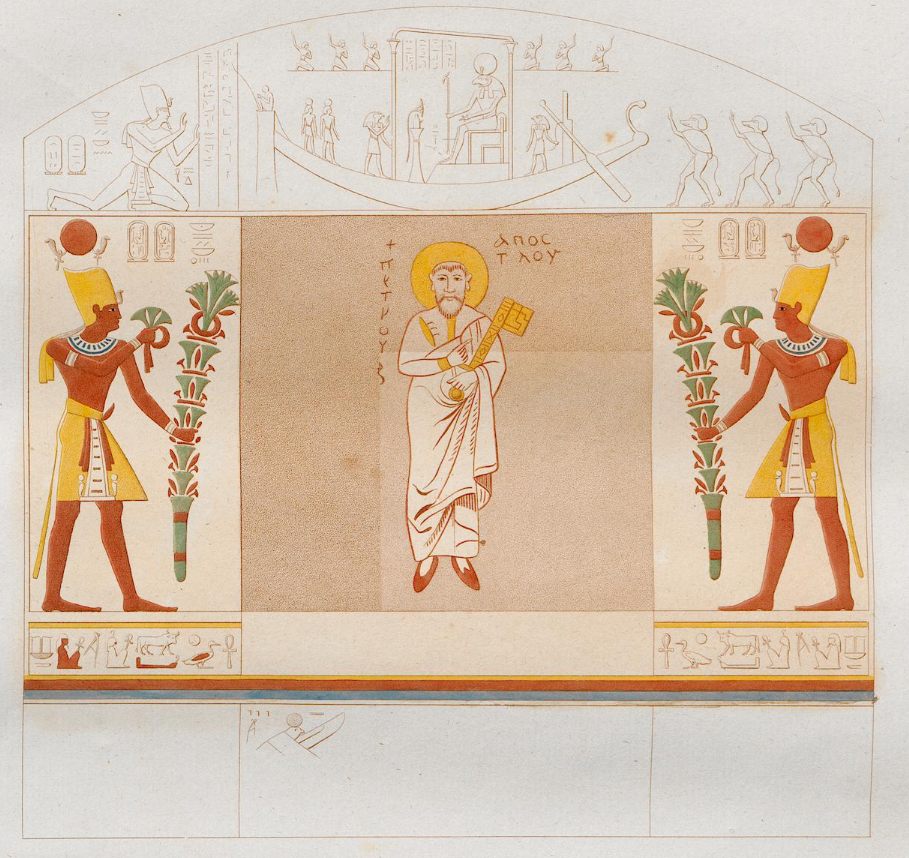
Christian painting of St. Peter in the temple of Wadi es-Sebua

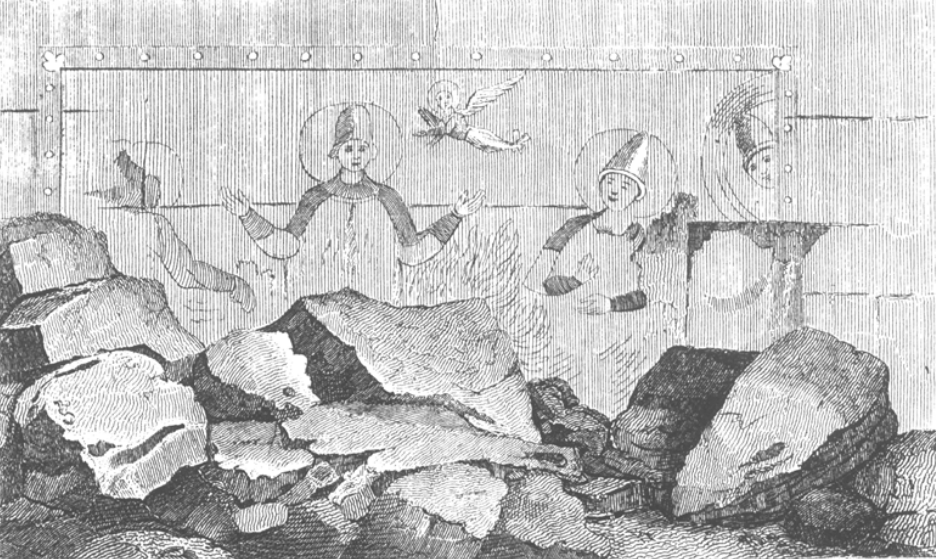
Christian wall paintings in the temple of Kalabsha

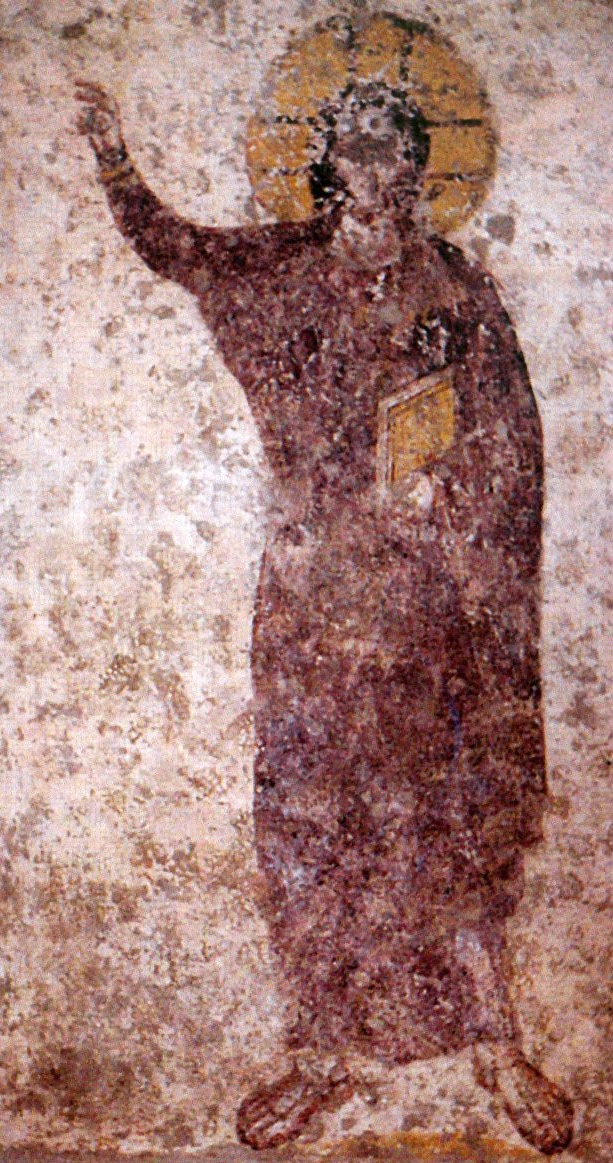
Painting of Christ on the ceiling of the converted Temple of Abu Oda near Gebel Adda

== Military culture ==
Nothing is known about the organization of the Nobatian army. Many of the weapons employed by the Nobatians had come from the Meroitic period.

=== Missile weapons ===
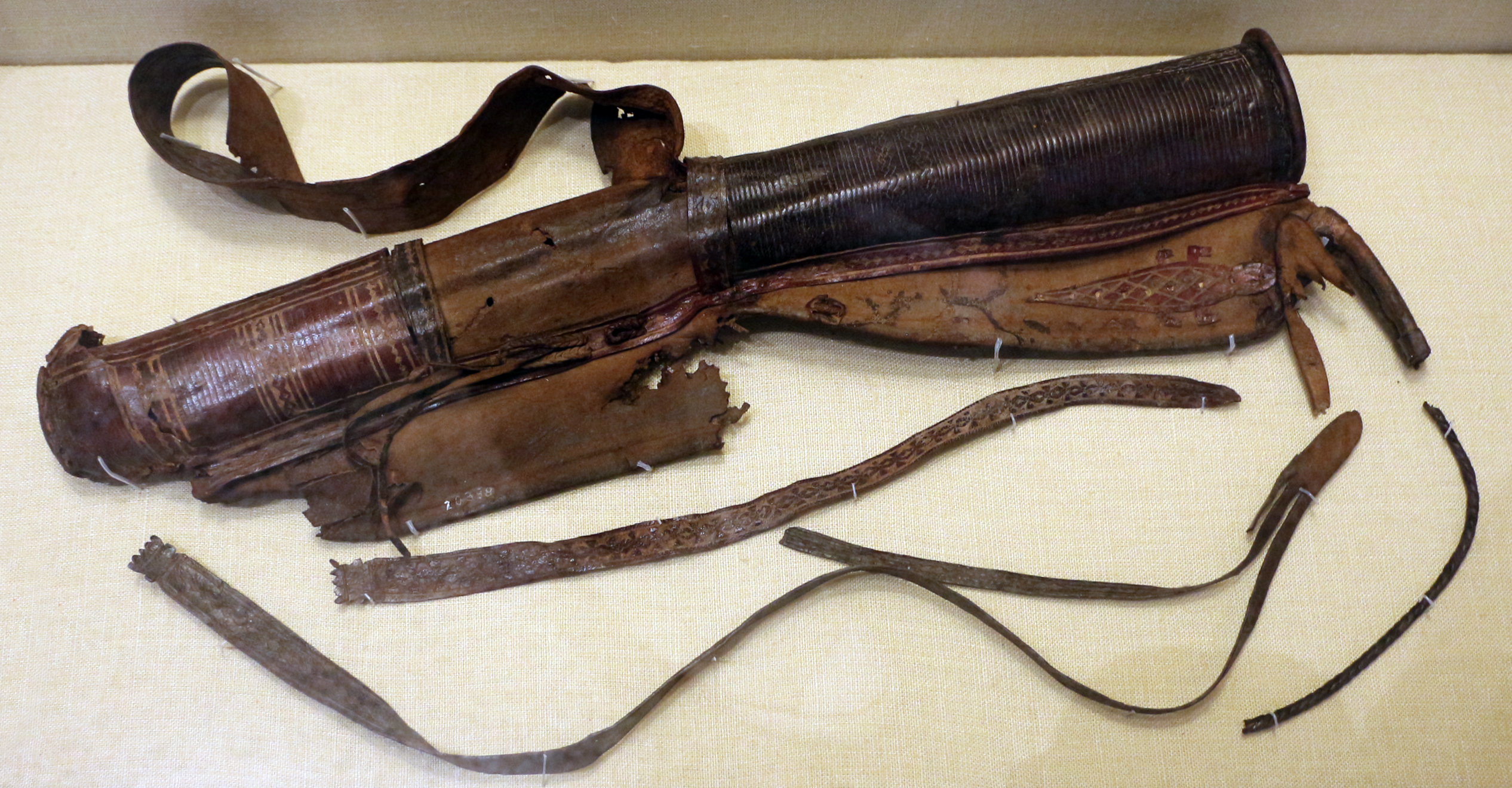
Quiver remains from Qustul, c. 400

Archaeology from the pagan period confirms the relevance archery had for the Nubians and therefore also the Nobatians. The slightly reflexed longsbows, which are attested for Kushite mercenaries since the Middle Kingdom, were replaced by reflex composite bows during the Meroitic or post-Meroitic period, measuring around one meter and originally designed to be shot from horseback. One simple wooden self bow is known from an early Nobadian burial in Qustul. The Nobadians shot barbed and possibly poisoned arrows of around 50 cm length. To store the arrows, they used quivers made of tanned leather from long-necked animals such as goats or gazelles. Additionally, they were enhanced with straps, flaps and elaborate decoration. The quivers were possibly worn on the front rather than on the back. On the hand holding the bow, the archers wore bracelets to protect the hand from injuries while drawing the bowstring. For the nobility, the bracelets could be made of silver, while poorer versions were made of rawhide. Furthermore, the archers wore thumb rings, measuring between three and four cm. Thus, Nubian archers would have employed a drawing technique very similar to the Persian and Chinese ones, both of which also reliant on thumb rings.

At Qasr Ibrim, two crossbow darts have been discovered. The use of crossbows had hitherto been unattested in Nubia.

=== Melee weapons ===
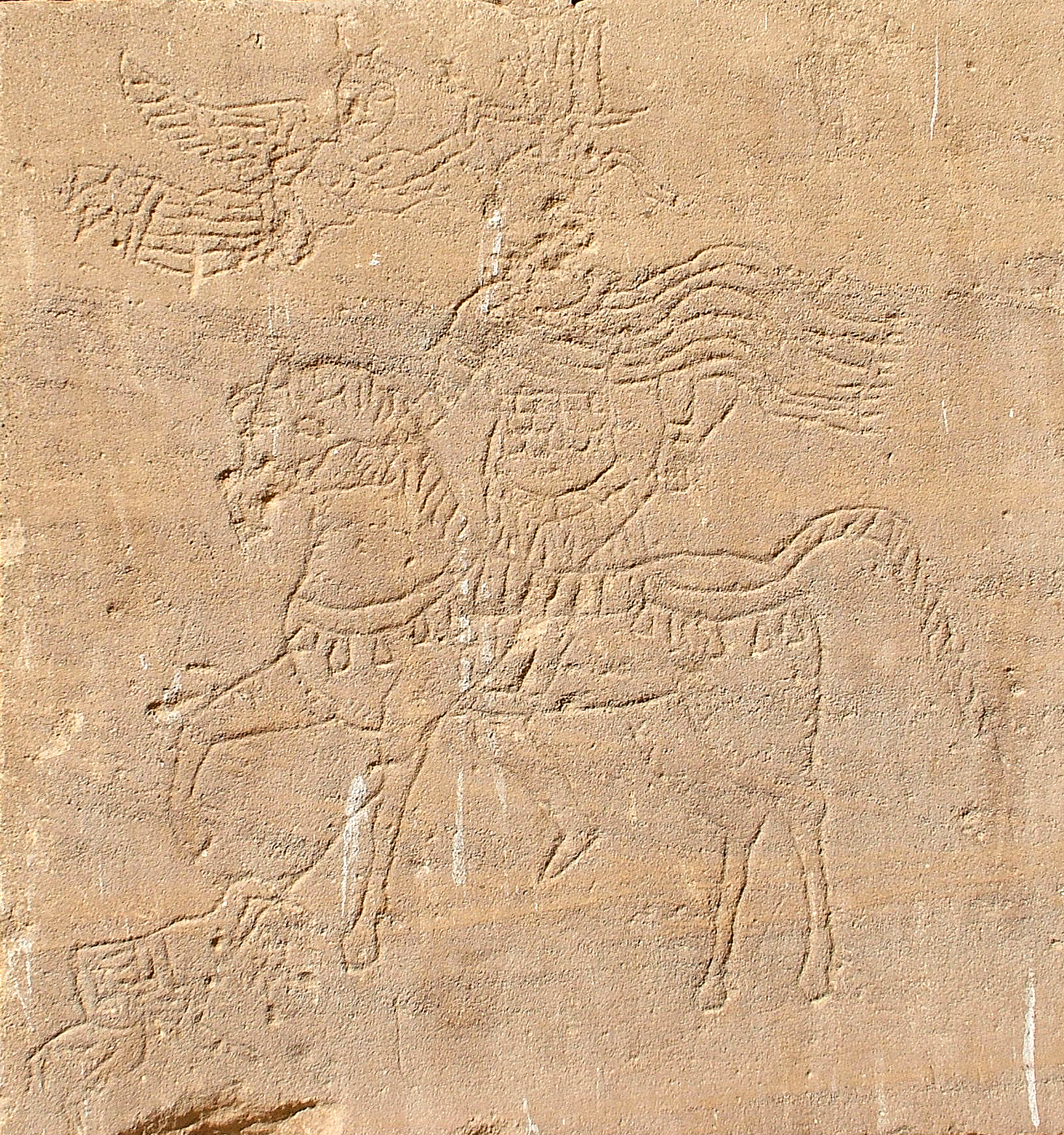
Graffito from the Temple of Kalabsha (Talmis), depicting King Silko on horse back spearing an enemy while being crowned by Nike.

A weapon characteristic for the Nobadians was a type of short sword. It has a straight hollow-ground blade which was sharpened only on one edge and was therefore not designed to thrust, but to hack. Apart from said swords, there were also lances, some of them with large blades, as well as halberds. It is possible that the large-bladed lances and the halberds were only ceremonial.

=== Body protection ===
Nobadian warriors and their leadership made use of shields and body armour, most of it manufactured from leather. Fragments of thick hide have been found in the royal tombs of Qustul, suggesting that the principal interment was usually buried while wearing armour. A well-preserved and richly decorated breastplate made of oxhide comes from Qasr Ibrim, while a comparable, but more fragmentary piece was discovered at Gebel Adda, albeit this one was made of reptile hide, possibly from a crocodile. Another fragment which possibly once constituted a body armour comes from Qustul. It consists of several layers of tanned leather and was studded with lead rosettes.
