= Faras =

Archaeological site in Sudan (Nubia)

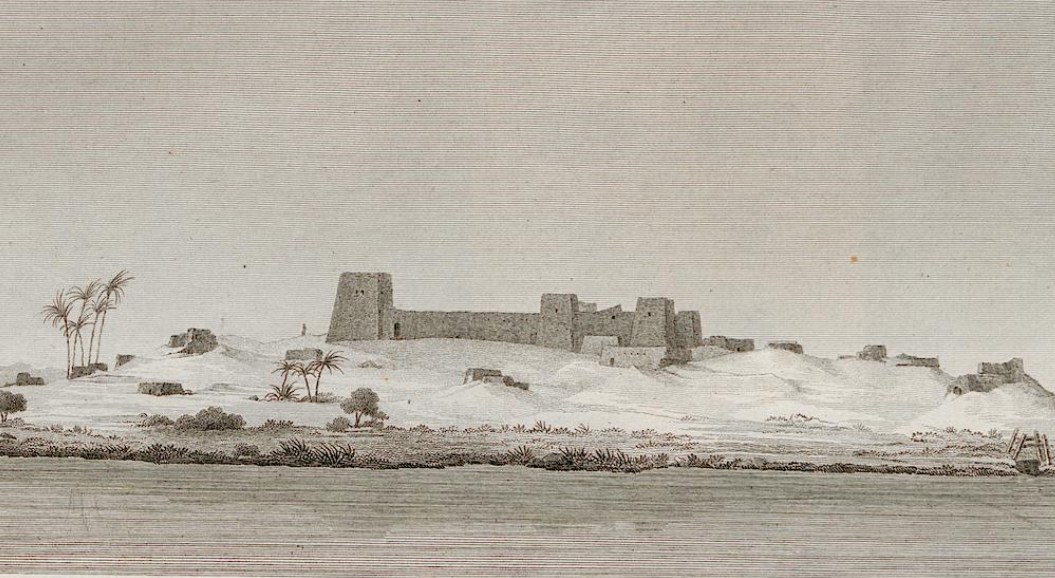
- Drawing of the Faras citadel in 1819
- Interactive map of Faras
- 22.2°N 31.4666°E
- Cultures: Nubia Ancient Egypt
- Location: Faras Wadi Halfa
- Region: Wadi Halfa Nubia

Faras (Arabic: فرس), formerly Pachoras (Latin) or Pakhoras (Ancient Greek: Παχώρας, Pakhṓras; Old Nubian: Ⲡⲁⲭⲱⲣⲁⲥ, Pakhōras) was a major city in Lower Nubia. The site of the city, on the border between modern Egypt and Sudan at Wadi Halfa Salient, was flooded by Lake Nasser in the 1960s and is now permanently underwater. Before the flooding, a Polish archaeological team led by professor Kazimierz Michałowski conducted extensive archaeological work.

== History ==
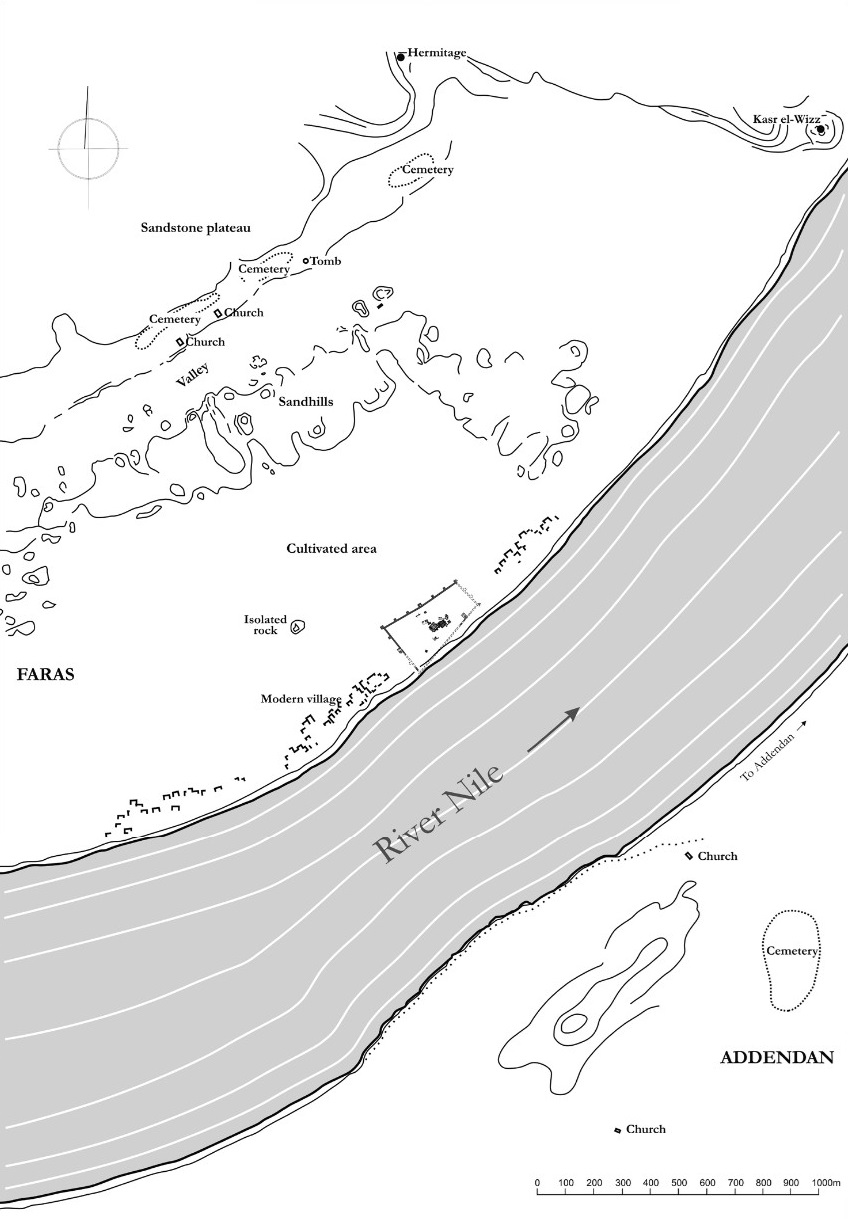
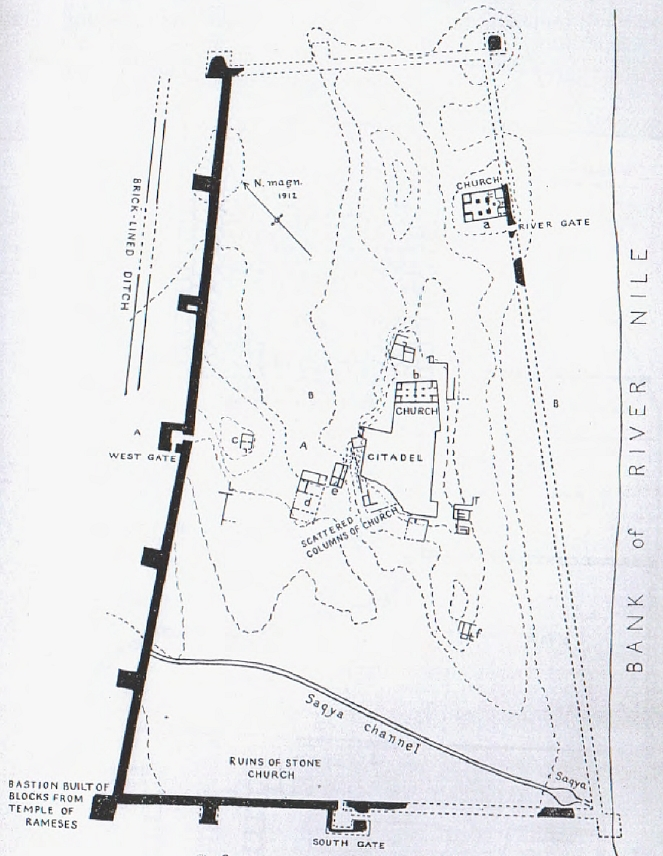
Left: Plan of Faras and its surroundings
Right: Plan of the enclosure in 1910

Dating back to the A-Group period, the town was a major centre during the Meroitic period, and was the site of a major temple. During ancient Egyptian control over Nubia, it became an Egyptian administrative centre; located upriver from Abu Simbel, it saw prominent Egyptian cultural influence.

The city reached its height during the Christian period of Nubia, when Pakhoras was the capital of the basiliskos Silko of Nobadia. When Makuria absorbed Nobatia, it remained the most prominent centre in the north and the seat of Nobadia's eparch. A nearby citadel at an archaeological site now known as Qasr or Kasr el-Wizz housed a major church and monastery, likely known as Apa Dios or Apa Dioskoros after a local saint.

In the turbulent later years of Christian Nubia, Pakhoras seems to have declined, and the administrative centre moved to the more easily defended area of Silmi (now Qasr Ibrim).

== Archaeology ==
In 1909–1912, research on the site was conducted by a British expedition from the University of Oxford headed by F.Ll. Griffith. The expedition uncovered Meroitic and Christian cemeteries, as well as Egyptian temples. At the turn of the 1960s, UNESCO organised the Nubian Salvage Campaign to preserve monuments from the area, which was to be flooded by Lake Nasser. Work in Faras, entrusted to Professor Kazimierz Michałowski, was carried out from 1960 to 1964 by the Polish Centre of Mediterranean Archaeology of the University of Warsaw in Cairo, which he had founded (now Polish Centre of Mediterranean Archaeology University of Warsaw). It turned out that the hill where the mission began excavations concealed a Christian cathedral with magnificent wall paintings. The researchers distinguished three main phases of its functioning. Bishop Aetios founded the cathedral in 620, and it was rebuilt twice: by Paulos at the beginning of the 8th century and by Petros I at the end of the 10th century. The subsequent buildings were named after these bishops. The cathedral had been completely filled with sand, thanks to which its structure and decoration were well preserved. These paintings are the best surviving examples of Christian Nubian art and depict portraits of archangels, mainly Michael, various monarchs and bishops of Faras, Christian saints, Virgin Mary and a number of Biblical scenes. They were executed in tempera on dry plaster, on several layers dated from the 8th to the 14th century. Of the 169 uncovered paintings, 120 were taken down from the walls. Sixty-six of them were transported to Poland and are today on display in the Polish National Museum in Warsaw, and in Sudan National Museum in Khartoum. In addition, a major pottery workshop was found. Thanks to the discovery of the List of Bishops of Faras, it was possible to date each episcopate and thus to establish the date of some of the wall paintings.

Gallery

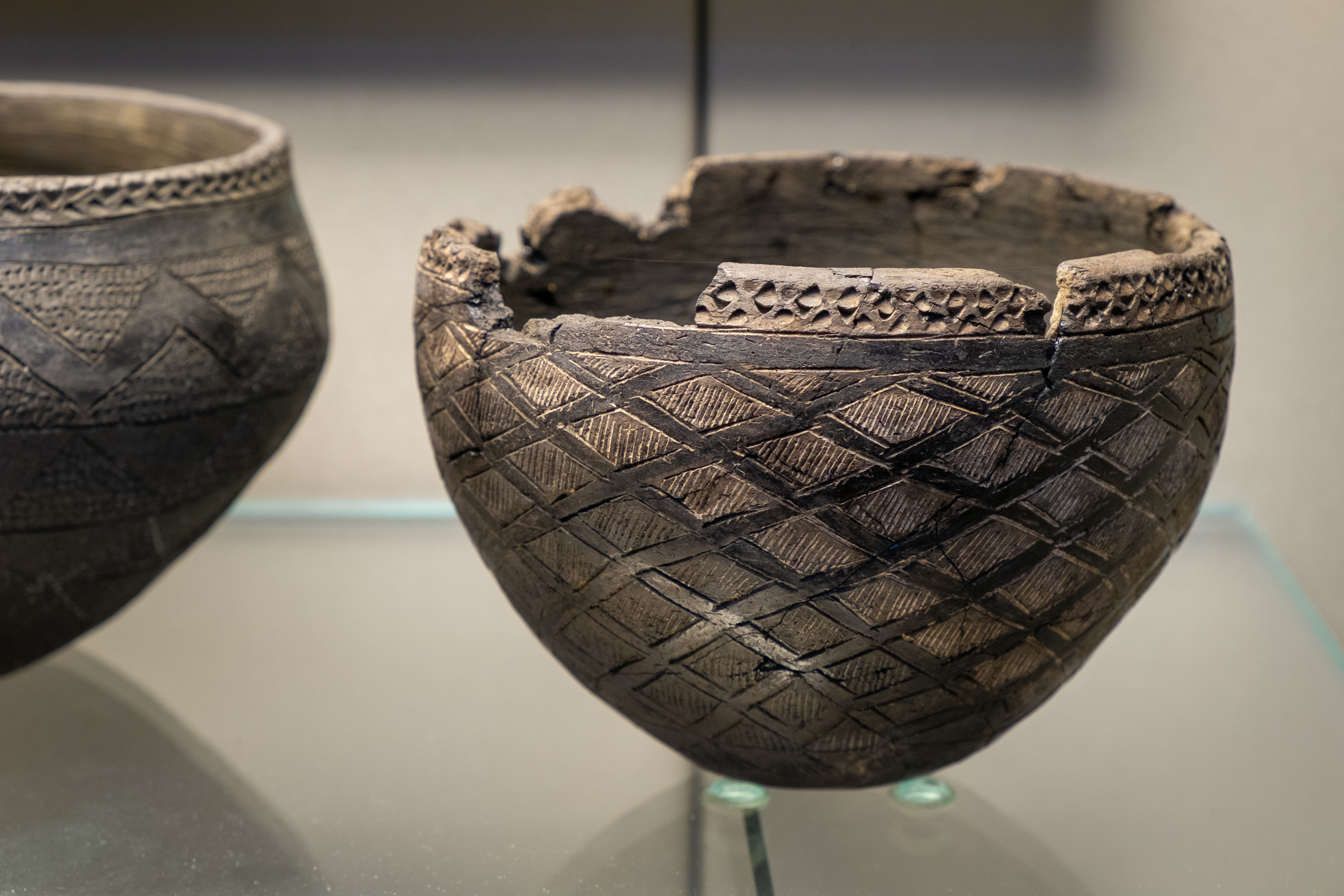
Pottery of the C-Group people, 2300-1600 BCE, Faras.

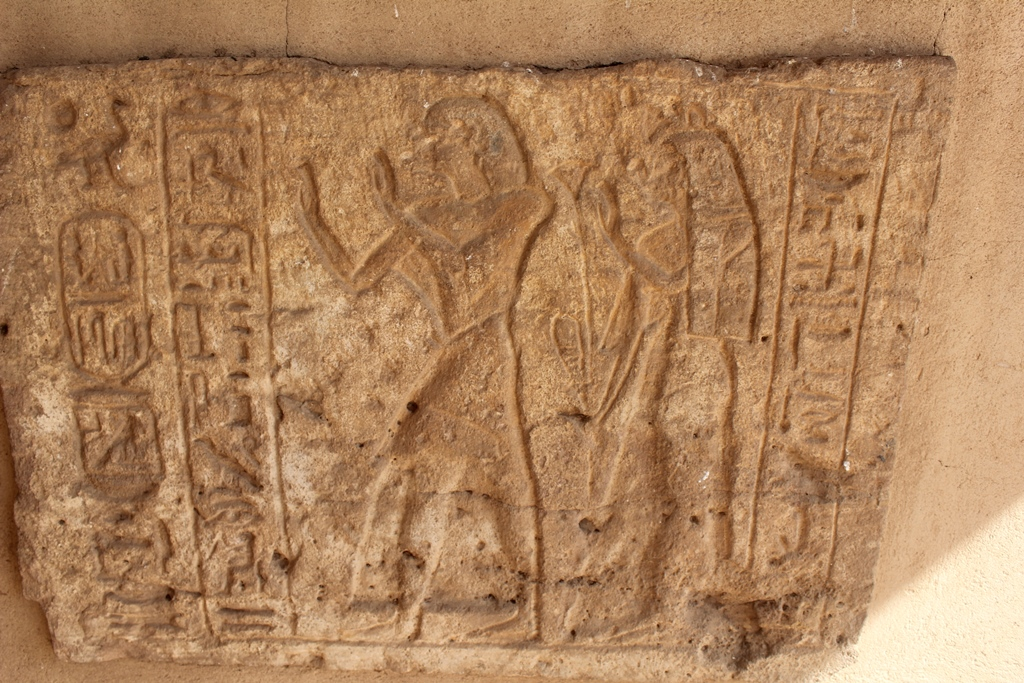
Stela, now in the National Museum of Sudan, with Setau, viceroy of Nubia, and his wife Nefro-mut worshipping Rameses II, whose Cartouche appears on the left side.

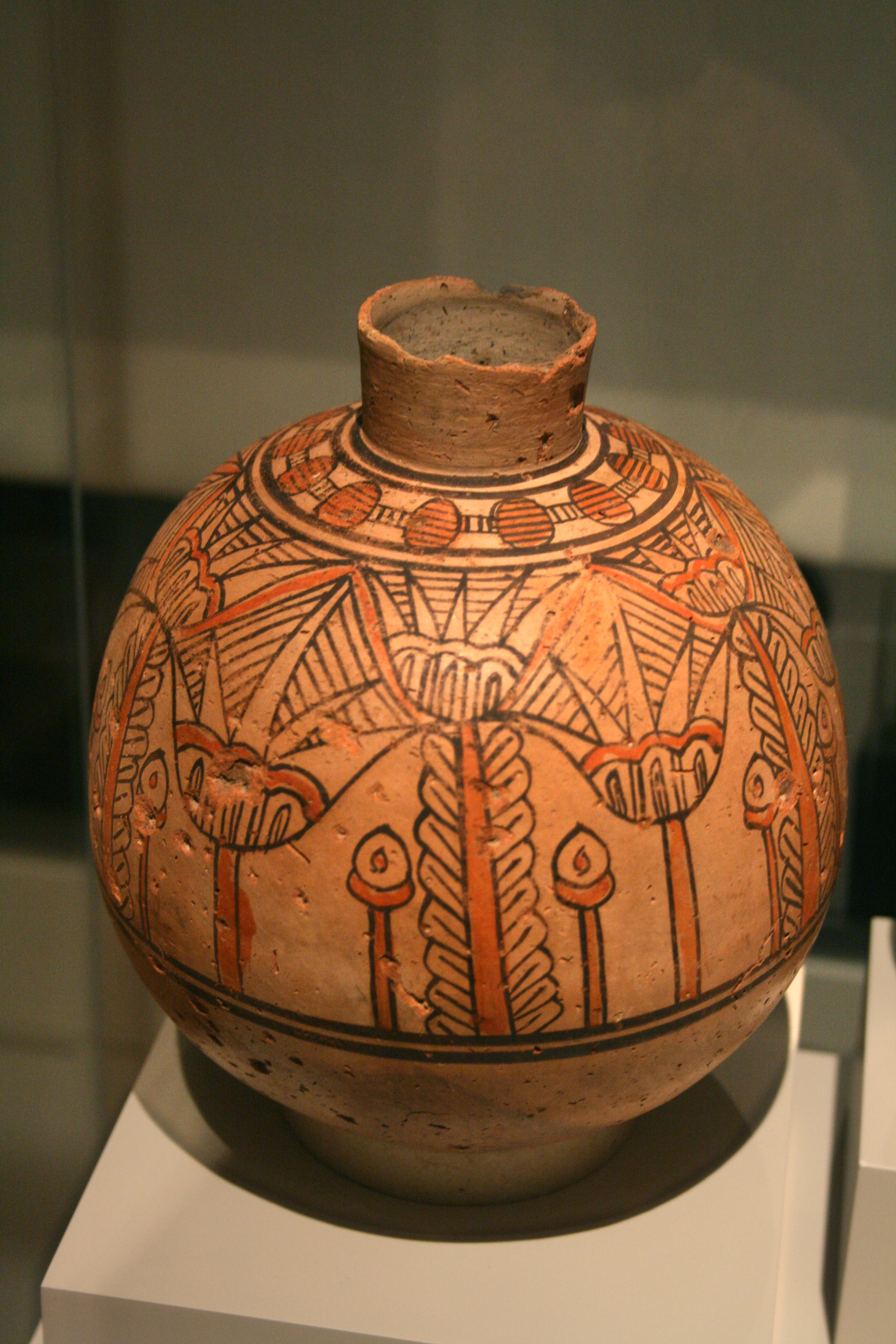
Meroitic pottery, now in Ägyptisches Museum Berlin

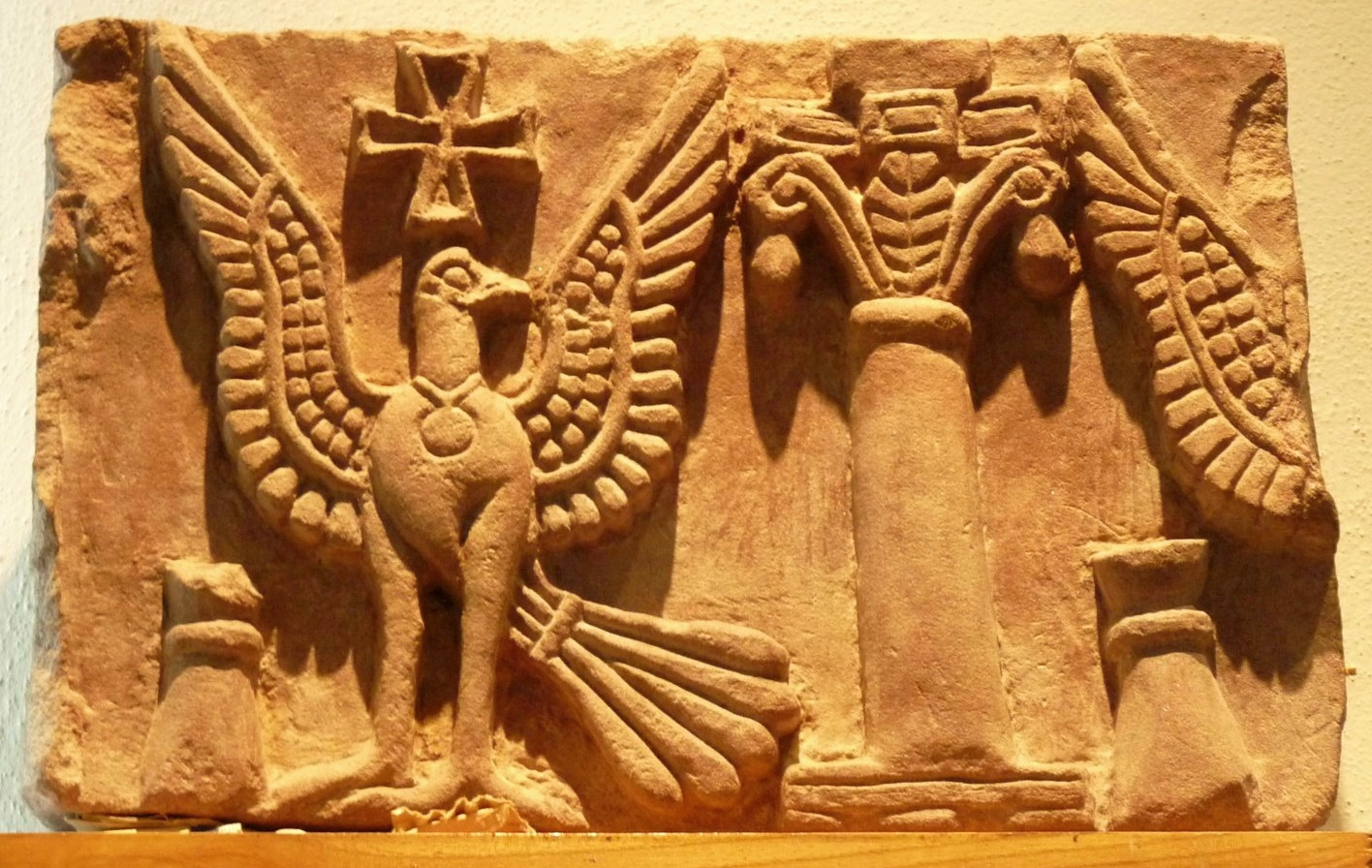
Fragment of the frieze with birds (National Museum in Warsaw)

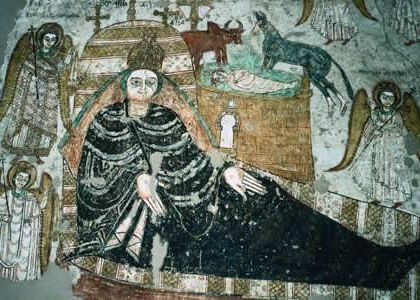
The Birth of Jesus - fresco in the Cathedral (Sudan National Museum in Khartoum)

== See also ==
- Coptic Diocese of Faras
- Faras Gallery at the National Museum in Warsaw
