= Saint Anne (wall painting) =

8th–9th century Nubian wall painting

- Święta Anna (Polish)
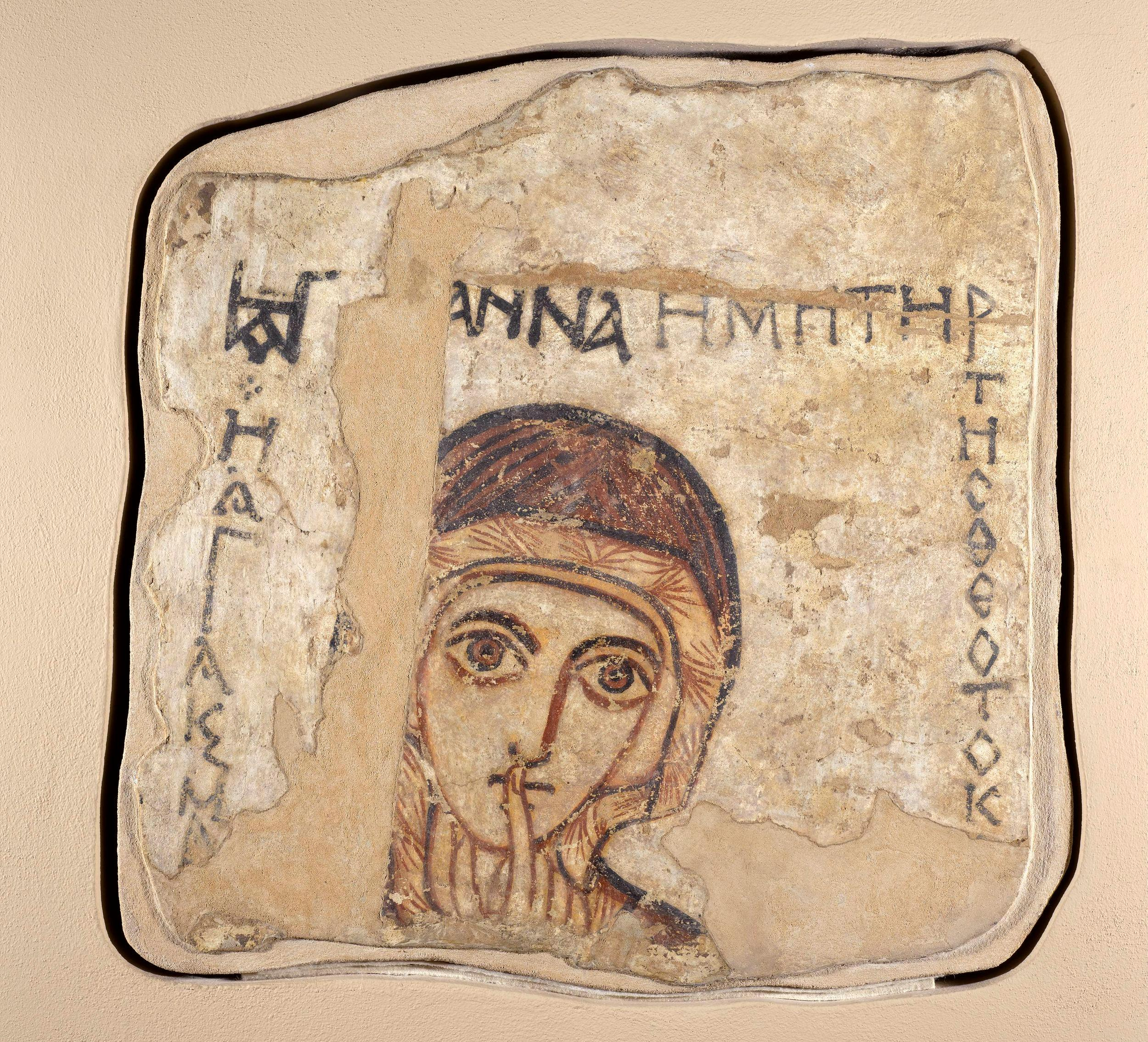
- Year: 7th–9th century
- Type: Wall painting
- Medium: Tempera on silt plaster
- Subject: Saint Anne
- Dimensions: 69 cm × 68.5 cm (27 in × 27.0 in)
- Location: National Museum; Warsaw; 22.1817°N 31.4969°E
- Owner: Faras Cathedral; Faras Wadi Halfa
- Accession: 234058

Saint Anne is a Makurian wall painting estimated to have been painted between the 8th and 9th centuries, painted al secco with tempera on plaster. The anonymous work was found at the Faras Cathedral within old Nubia in Faras Wadi Halfa present-day Sudan.

The painting was discovered by a Polish archaeological team during a campaign undertaken in the 1960s under the patronage of UNESCO (the Nubian Campaign) in Faras. Since 1964 the painting is in the collection of the National Museum in Warsaw. It is presented in Room VI of the Faras Gallery.

The image of Saint Anne has been used as a logo of the National Museum in Warsaw.

== The painting in its original setting ==
The wall painting of Saint Anne has been found in situ on the wall of the north nave, 3 metres from the floor level. It was painted on the first layer of plaster and was covered by its second layer, featuring a composition of Queen Martha. The northern nave at the Faras Cathedral may have been dedicated for women. The image of Saint Anne was not the only image of a woman presented there – this area of the Cathedral contained images of founders, saints, queens, martyrs, mothers, and healers. Many of these depictions were probably aimed at private prayer.

== Iconography ==
Saint Anne is a painting preserved in a fragment: it depicts the head and shoulders of the saint, as well as the upper part of her right hand held to her lips. It is possible the full painting depicted the entire figure of Saint Anne – standing or seated.

=== The image of Saint Anne ===
According to Kazimierz Michałowski, the saint is dressed in a purple maphorion, a type of hooded cloak. The folds of the hood are marked in black. The inside of the hood is light yellow, and its folds light purple. The face of Saint Anne is elongated, her nose long and straight, highlighted with a black, curved contour. The saint's eyes are wide open, with black, large irises encircled with black and purple; lower eyelids painted in light purple, and upper lids in dark purple. Anne's head is painted without a halo, an unusual omission for a portrait of a saint. Her hands are slim, with long fingers painted in light yellow with a purple contour. Her right hand is supporting her face, and the index finger with a visible fingernail is laid on her lips.

=== The iconography of Saint Anne and literary sources ===
Canonical sources do not mention Saint Anne; instead, she is mentioned in the Gospel of James – part of the Biblical apocrypha from between the 2nd and 3rd centuries CE written in Greek and translated into many eastern and western languages. She also appears in the Gospel of Pseudo-Matthew and many other apocryphal texts. These texts describe events related to the birth and childhood of the Virgin Mary and are modelled on the Old Testament, in which the births of biblical patriarchs are described as the result of divine intervention to defeat women's infertility. Saint Anne and her husband, saint Joachim, a devout Jew from the family of David, were childless, which in the Jewish society of the time was seen as shameful. Thanks to prayers and the faith in God's power Anne has conceived and given birth to a daughter, who later became the mother to Jesus. Anna and Joachim were later called Theopatores - God's ancestors.

== Veneration of Saint Anne in Nubia ==
Saint Anne is believed to have been venerated in Nubia. It was firstly related to her being the mother of Mary, and so an ancestor to Christ. B. Mierzejewska believes that Nubian women prayed to Saint Anne due to the miraculous conception of her daughter, hoping to gain her support and granting their requests related to childbearing, the health of children, pregnancy and welfare of mothers and children.

=== Other images of Saint Anne in Nubia ===
==== The second painting of Saint Anne at Faras Cathedral ====
The veneration of Mary's mother may be confirmed by the placement of another image of saint Anne on the second layer of plaster in the same nave. The second image is painted later and depicts the saint seated on a throne with baby Mary on her lap, perhaps in a breastfeeding position. The preserved fragment of that painting is in the collection of the National Museum of Sudan in Khartoum.

==== The image of Saint Anne at Abdallah Nirki ====
The depiction of Saint Anne was also discovered at a church in Abdallah Nirki near Faras. That painting depicts Anne standing. The painting was found in the north nave of a local church.

== Symbolism of Anne's gesture ==
Saint Anne of Faras is the only known depiction of this saint making the gesture of placing a finger on her lips. There are several interpretations of the symbolism of this gesture. It may be a command to remain quiet and silent. It may relate to the "God's silence", in which, according to Ignatius of Antioch three mysteries related to Mary took place: a miraculous conception, virginity and the birth of the Messiah. Another theory suggests that the gesture relates to prayer. In Egyptian and Palestinian monastic groups and some heretical groups, a custom existed of praying quietly while holding a finger of the right hand on one's lips; it was believed this gesture protected people from evil, which might otherwise prevail in human hearts during prayer.

== Inscription ==
The painting features an inscription in Greek. Both vertical registers are incomplete. According to S. Jakobielski the content of the inscription is: Saint Anne, mother to the Mother of God. Saint and... Jakobielski offers two theories on the ending of the inscription: Saint and Mary, or Saint and the Mother of Mary; the second version is coherent with the principles of reading the left vertical register before the other lines. One of the words of the inscription has been presented as a monogram representative of the period, used also in Byzantine painting.

== See also ==
- Bishop Petros with Saint Peter the Apostle
