= Nubiology =

Study of Ancient Nubia

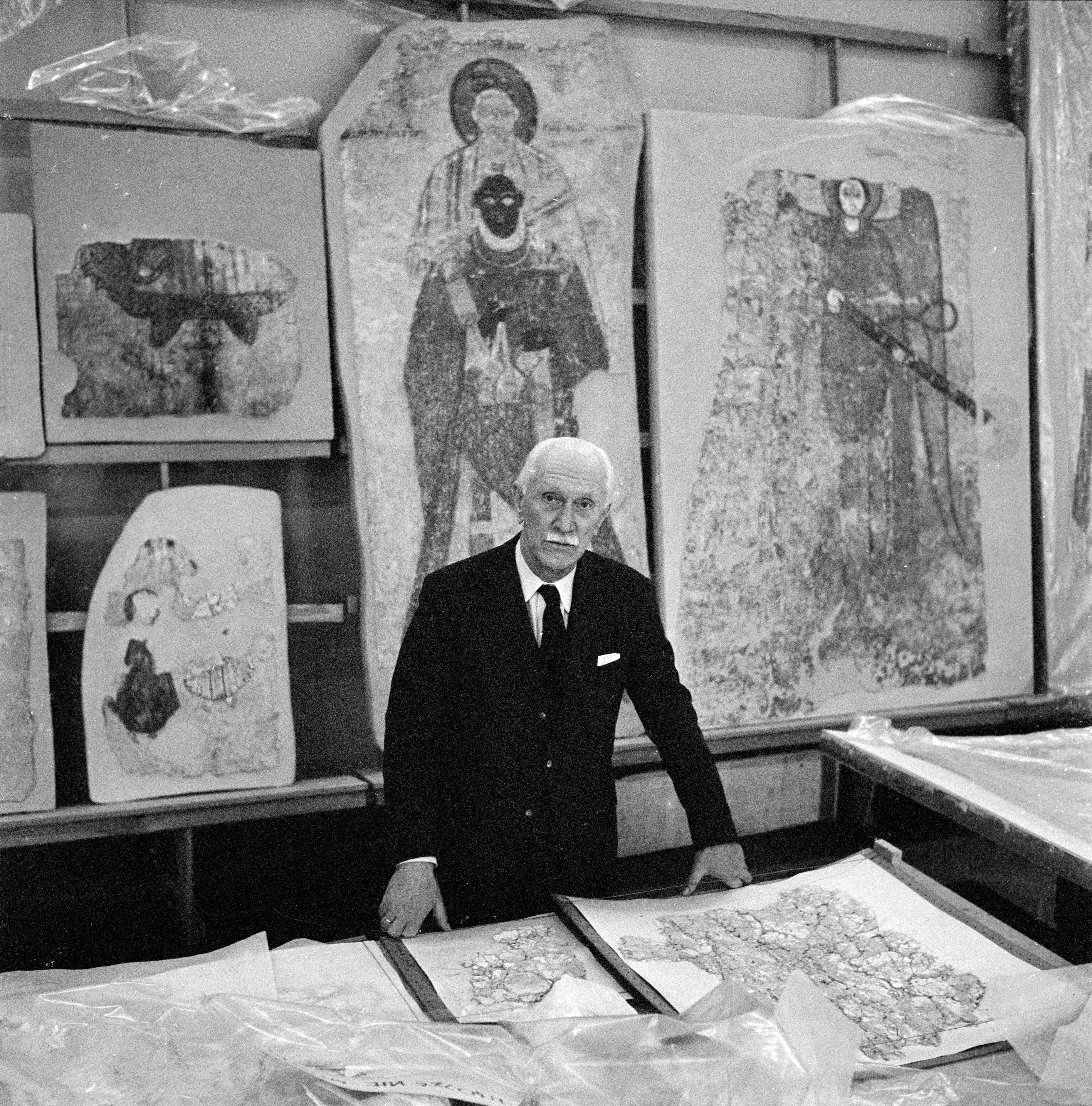
Kazimierz Michałowski, who coined the term Nubiology.

Nubiology is the scientific study of ancient Nubia, which existed in parts of modern-day Egypt and Sudan, predominantly in the Middle Nile region from Aswan to Khartoum. The term was coined by archaeologist Kazimierz Michałowski.

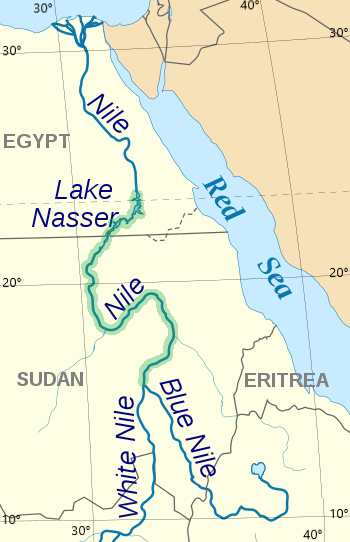
Outline of Nubia

== Nubian civilisations ==
Some archaeological sites have shown evidence which indicates that some Nubia civilisations might have been around even longer than some of the early Acheulean phases. Around the Acheulean period they would mostly use large cutting tools, hand axes and cleavers and are sites which are often neighbouring next to areas of Nubia. There were advancements in the north of Nubia in the Kharga Oasis and the Dakhla Oasis, they discovered Acheulean materials around the springs. These springs were artesian springs that were originally lakes which had been filled with warm water, these group would then settle their groups around these areas. There have been Nubia sites that have helped to determine the date the oldest phases of the Middle Stone Age in two different regions of Nubia.

In northern Sudan in the island of Sai there was evidence of two groups of the Middle Stone Ages and the Acheuleans who were identified as Sangoan that both occupied those lands simultaneously. The Sangoan's used core-axes as opposed to hand-axes, they had three horizons from 220 to 150 ka ago, the younger horizons showed artefacts that were related to the Lupemban Nubian Complex assemblages with examples of red and yellow ochre that may have shown evidence of extra utilitarian activities. There was a constant movement of Nubian immigration into Egypt, there has been evidence of artefacts such as cemeteries, potteries and some indication of Nubian settlements, due to their immigration the Nubians would either return to their home countries or be forced to integrate into Egyptian society and leave behind their former lives. This process is now referred to as ‘acculturation’ or ‘cultural entanglement’, it was also known as ‘creolization’ Aswan as this was the main frontier region for elements of both Egyptian and Nubian cultures. The knowledge and the skills that were brought to Egypt by the Nubians were then implemented by the Egyptians as they were able to use and profit from the Nubians workforce, specific knowledge and their variety of other skills. Nubians were able to have somewhat good communication with their neighbours in the Nile Valley, they kept this due to the changes in climate conditions in Eastern Sahara, the Nile Valley and other Western Desert regions. Archaeological researched showed that these climate changing issues are what led to many people migrating showing the formation of ‘creolization’ and ‘cultural entanglement’.

== Nubiology in the present day ==
There are still various projects active in the archaeological field in Egypt and Sudan researching into Nubiology both locally and globally from other international countries with an interest in the area. These projects have been a mixture of both state and non-state archeological organisations or individual reasonings behind these projects. Many of the countries involved in these projects have had involvement in this for large amounts of time, for example many European countries have had large involvement in it dating back over multiple centuries. The number of countries participating in this has been growing over the years, especially within more recent decades. These countries have chosen over the years to participate in archeology and Nubiology for a variety of reasons based on different social and political interests within each country. Most of the organised archaeological projects have to at least some involvement from outside countries such as Japan, Britain, China, Qatar and Russia. This level of involvement is more prominent in Egypt but does also happen in Sudan through co-operation with the Egyptian and Sudanese governments to perform any of the field work. Research into archeology by countries like Qatar in more recent years has become important for more projects as they began to look more into Egypt and especially Sudans Nubiology as a way to provide more of a focus onto their histories, it was a part of Qatar's cultural diplomacy that allowed for the increased amount of international recognition and for their national identity. Many of the historians that are researching into Nubiology archaeology now will typically already have previous background knowledge in other similar fields like Egyptology, European, North America and the Middle East. The study of Nubian archaeology has become a more useful subject in order to understand the differing African cultures in areas such as the Middle Nile.

== Important Nubian discoveries ==
From 1998 there have been a series of excavations in Banganarti, which is located in the area of Old Dongola in North Sudan, it was a Polish archaeological project that was supervised by Bogdan Żurawski. There was several buildings including the main centre building, the seven chapels, the Lower Church and the Upper Church. The Upper Church that they were able to the uncover was dedicated to the Archangel Raphael and the church was decorated with murals that many of them were eventually destroyed. Within the seven eastern chapels they all had similar murals and a depiction of the Nubian king who was shown as being protected by the archangel and the twelve apostles, they were also depictions of the Nubian kings holding sceptres that showed a small silhouette of Jesus Christ on top of them. The buildings within these structures showed there were refuge forts built in Selib, it showed that they had carefully thought how their warning systems and where to take refuge if it was needed. They would either seeks refuge in Selib or in the island of Tanqasi that had a church, a well and a basin used to water flocks. These sites showed that it was preferred by these societies to live in more open settlements around the Middle Nile as it was closer to their fields and then if necessary they could then seek refuge in the Nubian forts when it was required. Excavation of a site in the Western Desert in Egypt by R. Schild was believed to have artefacts that could be a part of Oldowan, they did an examination of some samples of lag gravel from a sandstone ridge located near Gebel Nabta. Here they were able to find around a dozen flakes, multiple choppers that had been severely abraded and some bifacial discoidal specimens.

From the area around Kaddanarti and Kabrinarti there are three excavation sites near the Third Cataract vicinity that also had evidence of stone finds and bones within the layers of coarse pebbles, it was determined that these artefacts to be Lower Paleolithic and preceded the Acheulean period. The stone finds that were discovered consisted of items like brown flint, petrified wood, flakes and other stone tools including choppers, whilst the bones belonged to large bovids, antelopes, hippopotamus that were largely mineralised. There was also some evidence of a Levallois core that was a type of Nubia found from Kaddanarti which is a core that is usually related to the Middle Stone Age.

== List of Nubiologists ==
- Solange Ashby
- E. A. Wallis Budge
- Dows Dunham
- John Garstang
- Stefan Jakobielski
- Fritz Hintze
- Ursula Hintze
- Karl Richard Lepsius
- Kazimierz Michałowski
- George Andrew Reisner
- Claude Rilly
- Peter Shinnie
- László Török
- Jean Vercoutter

== See also ==
- Egyptology
- A-Group culture
- C-Group culture
- X-Group culture
