= Barbara Ruszczyc =

Polish Egyptologist and art historian

- Born: 18 September 1928; Vilnius, Poland
- Died: 11 August 2001 (aged 72); Warsaw, Poland
- Education: John Paul II Catholic University of Lublin; Warsaw University
- Scientific career
- Fields: archaeology; Egyptology; art history
- Workplaces: University of Warsaw; National Museum in Warsaw; John Paul II Catholic University of Lublin
- Doctoral advisor: Kazimierz Michałowski

Barbara Ruszczyc (1928–2001) was a Polish Egyptologist and art historian. She was curator at the Department of Ancient Art at the National Museum in Warsaw from 1973 to 1990. In 1987, Ruszczyc was awarded the Knight's Cross of the Order of Polonia Restituta.

== Early life and education ==
Barbara Ruszczyc was born in Vilnius, Poland on 18 September 1928. She was the daughter of Regina Rouck and renowned painter Ferdynand Ruszczyc. Ruszczyc's father died in 1936 when she was eight years old. Her mother died three years later. The youngest of six children, Ruszczyc went to live with her older sister Janina, who had to drop out of Warsaw University in 1939 to care for her dying mother as well as her brothers and sisters.

In 1939, during the beginning of World War II, Soviet troops attacked Poland and occupied Vilnius, where Ruszczyc and her family were living. They fled to their country estate in Bohdanow, Belarus. The Soviets eventually took over the estate in Bohdanow and later destroyed their home in 1944. Ruszczyc and her siblings were forced to move often during the war and were separated from their older sister Janina when she was imprisoned by the Germans.

After the war, Ruszczyc moved to Warsaw where her oldest sister Janina was living and working as an art historian at the National Museum in Warsaw. Ruszczyc continued her education in Warsaw where she graduated from secondary school in 1950. She then enrolled at Warsaw University and also began working at the museum in 1949, initially as a guide and later in the Department of Ancient Art. At the university, she studied Mediterranean archaeology with a primary focus on Ancient Egypt and the Near East. Ruszczyc continued her studies at the university after graduation and earned a master's degree in Egyptian archeology in 1955. She continued her studies and her work at the museum and was granted her PhD from Warsaw University in 1972. Her doctoral advisor was Professor Kazimierz Michalowski.

== Career ==
In 1957, Professor Kazimierz Michalowski invited Ruszczyc to participate in archaeological expeditions in Egypt and the Sudan. From 1969 to 1984, she was promoted to field director of excavations at the ancient city of Tell Atrib in Egypt. In Tell Atrib, the plan was to locate, uncover and restore an early Coptic cathedral from the 8th century. The expedition was halted by war in the Middle East. The excavation was resumed ten years later in 1979 and continued until 1984. Ruszczyc published the results of the excavation in 1997. She also published a number of works on the ancient art collection at the National Museum in Warsaw. She served as senior curator for special exhibitions in ancient art until her retirement from the museum in 1990.

During her 40-year career, Ruszczyc lectured on the history of ancient Egyptian and Mesopotamian art the University of Warsaw. She also taught art history and archaeology of the Near East from 1973 to 1993 at the John Paul II Catholic University of Lublin.

Ruszczyc served as librarian for the Library of Writers of the Jesuit Association in Warsaw. She was instrumental in establishing a library in the small city of Chortkiv in Ukraine. After she retired, Ruszczyc worked as a volunteer at the National Museum in Warsaw, helping to restore pottery and glass artifacts.
