= Pope Gabriel IV of Alexandria =

Head of the Coptic Church from 1370 to 1378

- Pope of Alexandria and Patriarch of the See of St. Mark
- Papacy began: 6 January 1370
- Papacy ended: 28 April 1378
- Predecessor: John X
- Successor: Matthew

Personal details
- Born: Egypt
- Died: 28 April 1378 Egypt
- Buried: Church of the Holy Virgin (Babylon El-Darag)
- Denomination: Coptic Orthodox Christian
- Residence: Saint Mercurius Church in Coptic Cairo

Gabriel IV (died 1378) was the 86th Coptic Pope and Patriarch of Alexandria from 1370 until his death.

Gabriel had a brother, Claudius (Iqludah), who was a priest and monk of the monastery of al-Muharraq, of which Gabriel was the abbot. He also had a married sister and a nephew, Rizqallah, who was a deacon. Gabriel was known as a great scholar and righteous ascetic. Claudius was also known for his learning; in 1388 he ordered a copy of the Philokalia.

He was consecrated on Epiphany Sunday, 11 Tuba 1086 AM (corresponding to 6 January 1370) in the church of Saints Sergius and Bacchus in Alexandria. His consecration at Alexandria rather than Cairo was unusual for the time.

Although next to nothing is known of Gabriel's pastoral duties, he does not seem to have been unduly encumbered by the authorities. As patriarch, he visited the monasteries of the Wadi al-Natrun. He imported olive oil from Syria and spiny broom from Beirut. He sent the priest Ibn al-Qudsi to Damascus to obtain a copper vessel. In 1371, Gabriel consecrated Timothy as bishop of Qasr Ibrim in Nobadia.

In 1374, Gabriel was staying at the monastery of Saint Macarius the Great during a famine. In order to prolong his stay without harming the monks, he supplied his and his bishops' own provisions. That same year he took part in the consecration of the holy chrism (myron) and had Athanasius of Qus compose an account of the rite. With the new myron, Gabriel reconsecrated six portable altars that had been profaned, although we are not told how. He went on a circuit of several monasteries, distributing the myron: the monastery of John the Little, inhabited by Ethiopians and Armenians; the Monastery of Saint Pishoy, inhabited by Syrians, Ethiopians and Armenians; the monastery of Old Baramus; the monastery of Our Lady Baramus; and the monastery of John Kama. Afterwards he returned to Saint Macarius.

Gabriel IV was contemporary of Al-Ashraf Nasir-ad-Din Shaban II and Al-Mansur Alah-ad-Din Ali, the Bahri sultans. He reigned for 8 years, 3 months and 22 days. He died on 3 Pashons 1094 AM (28 April 1378), and was buried next to Simon the Tanner.

Preceded by John X	Coptic Pope; 1370–1378	Succeeded by Matthew I
