= Athanasius of Qus =

Athanasius of Qus (fl. late 14th century) was a Coptic monk, bishop and scholar. He was a leader of the church in Upper Egypt and Lower Nubia. He wrote in both Arabic and Coptic. His works include theology, Coptic grammar and poetry. His primary dialect was Sahidic.

== Life ==
He wrote in Arabic a grammar of the Coptic language entitled Necklace of Composition in the Science of Interpretation. Most of what is known about his life comes from this work. He was born at Qamulah on the right bank of the Nile, the son of a priest named Salib. He entered the nearby monastery of Mar Buqtur on the left bank of the Nile before succeeding Gabriel as bishop of the fortified city of Qus. In 1371–1372, he took part in the consecration and enthronement of Timothy as bishop of Qasr Ibrim. In 1374, during the patriarchate of Gabriel IV, he took part in the concoction of the chrism (myron) and wrote a description of the Upper Egyptian rite.

In the past, his activity was sometimes dated to the eleventh century, but the evidence points towards the second half of the fourteenth. The Berlin manuscript of the Necklace contains a preface to a different (lost) grammar in which the Ecclesiastical Ladder of Yuhanna al-Samannudi is mentioned. If this preface was written by Athanasius, as seems likely, his dates must be pushed back at least to the second half of the thirteenth century. He is not mentioned in any thirteenth-century grammars or dictionaries, nor is he in the index of authors of Ibn Kabar (died 1324).

His episcopate corresponds to a rough period for the Copts of Upper Egypt. The city of Qus was targeted by the Banu al-Kanz, who lost their control of Makuria in 1365. There were also outbreaks of plague in 1374–1375 and 1379–1381, Nile floods in 1360, 1376, 1382 and 1395, and famines in 1374–1375 and 1394–1396. There were even new martyrs in Qamulah in 1378.

== Works ==
Athanasius' Necklace was originally composed for the Sahidic dialect, but a Bohairic version also exists. Athanasius himself records that these were the only two surviving dialects of Coptic, Bashmuric being extinct by his time. This is, however, the earliest reference to a Bashmuric dialect, which has not been conclusively identified in any of surviving Coptic text. Athanasius' Necklace, moreover, is the first major treatment of Sahidic and he also wrote a commentary (sharḥ) on his Sahidic grammar. A Sahidic sullam (Copto-Arabic dictionary) is also attributed to him. The Sahidic in Athanasius' account of the rite of the chrism was supplied by his colleague Gabriel, bishop of al-Marg. This is one of the latest descriptions of the unique Upper Egyptian rite. The lost grammar prefaced in the Berlin manuscript, titled Sufficiency of the Seeker, was in the form of a didactic poem in which Sahidic homonyms were explained through Arabic.

Besides his grammatical works, Athanasius also composed poetry between 1365 and 1378. He may also be the author of the Triadon, a long poem in Sahidic that survives in a single manuscript with an Arabic translation. The poet describes himself as a monk from Upper Egypt who moved to Lower Egypt and used his native tongue in order to demonstrate its suitability.

His theological works include a treatise (arguzah) on baptism and another in the form of 100 questions from the Canons of the Apostles.

Athanasius' is "one of the last names that can be mentioned for the 13th- and 14th-century golden age of Copto-Arabic literature". His ambit and his preference for Sahidic are representative of the southward shift of the Coptic centre of gravity under the Mamluks. The sharḥ he wrote on his own grammar was the main source for Raphael Tuki's Rudimenta linguae coptae sive aegyptiacae ad usum Collegii Urbani de Propaganda Fide (1778).

== Bibliography ==
- Browne, Gerald M. (1983). "Notes on Athanasius of Qūṣ". Orientalia. Nova Series. 57 (2): 268–270. JSTOR 43077520.
- Feder, Frank (2017). "The Bashmurite Revolts in the Delta and the 'Bashmuric Dialect'". In Gawdat Gabra; Hany N. Takla (eds.). Christianity and Monasticism in Northern Egypt: Beni Suef, Giza, Cairo, and the Nile Delta. American University in Cairo Press. pp. 33–36.
- Frederick, Vincent (1991). "Athanasius of Qus". In Aziz Suryal Atiya (ed.). The Coptic Encyclopedia. Vol. 1. New York: Macmillan Publishers. cols. 303b–304a.
- Gabra, Gawdat, ed. (2009). The A to Z of the Coptic Church. Scarecrow Press.
- Peterson, T. C. (1913). An Unknown Copto-Arabic Grammar by Athanasius Bishop of Kus, or the Source of Tukhi's Rudimenta lingua coptae sive aegyptiacae (PhD dissertation). The Catholic University of America.
- Sidarus, Adel Y. (1978). "Coptic Lexicography in the Middle Ages". In Robert McLachlan Wilson (ed.). The Future of Coptic Studies. E. J. Brill. pp. 125–142.
- Sidarus, Adel Y. (2001). "Medieval Coptic Grammars in Arabic". Journal of Coptic Studies. 3: 63–79. doi:10.2143/JCS.3.0.503607.
- Youssef, Youhanna Nessim (2010). "Athanasius of Qus and His Time". In Gawdat Gabra; Hany N. Takla (eds.). Christianity and Monasticism in Upper Egypt. Vol. 2. The American University in Cairo Press. pp. 171–180.
