= Fritz Hintze =

German archaeologist

- Born: 18 April 1915; Berlin, Germany
- Died: 30 March 1993 (aged 77); Berlin, Germany
- Education: Humboldt University
- Spouse: Ursula Hintze
- Scientific career
- Workplaces: Humboldt University

Fritz Hintze (18 April 1915 – 30 March 1993) was a German Egyptologist, Nubiologist, and archaeologist. He is the founder of Sudanese archaeology in Germany.

Hintze studied at Humboldt University of Berlin under Hermann Grapow and received his doctorate in 1944.

In 1957, he founded the Institute of Egyptology at Humboldt University. He retired in 1980.

Hintze's main area of research was the study of meriotic culture in Nubia. He undertook field research projects at Butana (1957–58) and Musawwarat es-Sufra (1960–1970). Among his students were a generation of Egyptologists, many of whom specialize in the Sudan of antiquity, including Erika Endesfelder, Liselotte Honigmann-zinserling, Irene Shirun-Grumach, Karl-Heinz Priese, Walter-Friedrich Reineke and Steffen Wenig.

His wife was German archaeologist Ursula Hintze. Hintze was killed on 30 March 1993 in a car accident.

== Books ==
- Hintze, Fritz; Hintze, Ursula (1966). Alte Kulturen im Sudan (in German). Callwey.
- Hintze, Fritz; Hintze, Ursula (1968). Civilization of the Old Sudan: Kerma, Kush, Christian Nubia.
