= Stefan Jakobielski =

Polish historian, archaeologist and philologist (1937–2024)

- Born: 11 August 1937; Warsaw, Poland
- Died: 14 October 2024 (aged 87)
- Parent(s): Karol Jakobielski; Halina Grzymala

Stefan Karol Jakobielski (11 August 1937 – 14 October 2024) was a Polish historian, archaeologist, philologist, and epigraphist. One of the pioneers of nubiology. He participated in archaeological research in Faras, Tell Atrib, Palmyra, Deir el-Bahari, and Qasr Ibrim; directed the archaeological works at Old Dongola.

== Biography ==
Jakobielski was born in Warsaw on 11 August 1937. His parents were Karol Jakobielski and Halina née Grzymała. He graduated from secondary school – liceum im. St. Małachowskiego – in Płock. He began studying at the University of Warsaw in 1954.

From the early 1960s, he participated in the excavation works in Faras led by Kazimierz Michałowski. From 1961, Jakobielski participated in the archaeological effort as a coptologist, documenting and researching inscriptions. He took part in key works at the archaeological site in Faras – the discovery of the cathedral with wall paintings in the 1961–1962 season and during two subsequent expeditions: 1962–1963 and 1963–1964; he also participated in the removal and transfer of wall paintings and the documentation of discoveries, presented now at the Faras Gallery at the National Museum in Warsaw. In the early 1960s, Jakobielski participated in works at many other archaeological sites: in 1962, as an epigrapher at Tell Atrib and Palmyra. In 1962 or 1963 he took part in research and excavation work at Deir el-Bahari at the Mortuary Temple of Hatshepsut and the temple of Totmes III. In 1968, Jakobielski successfully defended his PhD thesis.

In 1966, Jakobielski became director of excavation works at the Nubian site of Dongola. After the death of prof. Michałowski in 1981 he was appointed the head of this expedition on behalf of the Polish Centre of Mediterranean Archaeology University of Warsaw, a function he held until 2006. Reports from excavations at that site were published in "Dongola Studien" and the "Polish Archaeology in the Mediterranean". The excavations in Dongola were concluded by an exhibition at the National Museum in Warsaw in 2006, entitled Polish excavations in Old Dongola. 45 years of archaeological cooperation with Sudan; Jakobielski was the co-curator of that exhibition. The exhibition contained artifacts discovered at multiple sites and borrowed from the National Museum of Sudan in Khartoum.

From 1972 to 1974 by invitation of the Egypt Exploration Society Jakobielski participated in a British-American-Polish archaeological mission in Qasr Ibrim as archaeologist-epigraphist.

From 1974 to 2002, Jakobielski was the director of the Nubiology Department at the Research Center for Mediterranean Archaeology PAS, and at the same time he directed and chaired the Department of Archaeological and Architectural Documentation at the same institution. From 1974 till 1989 he lectured at the Cardinal Stefan Wyszynski University in Warsaw. An employee of the Institute of Mediterranean and Oriental Cultures PAS (previously Research Center for Mediterranean Archaeology PAS) since 1961.

Jakobielski was the author of numerous publications and editor of scientific journals, including Nubia, Études et Travaux, Nubielskica et Aethiopica and Bibliotheca nubica. Since 2005, co-editor of "Gdańsk Archaeological Museum African Reports".

Jakobielski died on 14 October 2024, at the age of 87.

== Membership in scientific associations ==
Jakobielski was one of the initiators of the International Society of Nubiology, established in 1972, and in 1978–1986 he served as a member of the Society's Board. Since 1980 he was a correspondent of the Deutsches Archäologisches Institut. Jakobielski also belonged to the International Association of Egyptologists.

== Distinctions ==
Jakobielski was awarded the Order of Polonia Restituta and Order of the Two Niles.

== Selected publications ==
- S. Jakobielski et alli. Pachoras/Faras. The wall paintings from the Cathedrals of Aetios, Paulos and Petros. Warsaw: PCMA UW; IKŚiO PAN; Muzeum Narodowe w Warszawie 2017
- 50 years of Polish excavations in Egypt and the Near East: acts of the Symposium at the Warsaw University 1986, éd. S. Jakobielski, J. Karkowski, Varsovie: Centre d'Archéologie Méditerranéenne de l'Académie Polonaise des Sciences 1992.
- A. S. Atiya, Historia Kościołów Wschodnich, Warsaw 1978 [Translation of chapters I–VII, XXVII and Epilogue by Stefan Jakobielski]
- Dongola-Studien: 35 Jahre polnischer Forschungen im Zentrum des makuritischen Reiches, hrsg. von S. Jakobielski, P. O. Scholz, Warsaw: Zakład Archeologii Śródziemnomorskiej Polskiej Akademii Nauk 2001.
- S. Jakobielski, 35 Years of Polish Excavations at Old Dongola. A Factfile [w:] Dongola-Studien, 35 Jahre polnischer Forschungen im Zentrum des makuritischen Reiches, ed. S. Jakobielski, P. Scholz, "Bibliotheca nubica et aethiopica" vol. 7, Warszawa-Wiesbaden, 2001, p. 1–48.
- S. Jakobielski, Christian Nubia at the height of its Civilization [in:] General History of Africa (UNESCO), vol. III – Africa from the Seventh to the Eleventh Century, Paris – Berkeley, 1988, p. 194–223.
- S. Jakobielski, The Early Christian Period in Nubia [w:] History of Humanity, Scientific and Cultural Development, vol. III: From the Seventh Century BC to the Seventh Century AD, ed.: J. Herrmann, E. Zürcher, chap. 15.2.3, UNESCO Paris, New York 1996, p. 326–331.
- S. Jakobielski, Grecka inskrypcja fundacyjna katedry w Faras, "Rocznik Muzeum Narodowego w Warszawie" 1966, 10, p. 99–106
- S. Jakobielski, A history of the bishopric of Pachoras on the basis of Coptic inscriptions, Warsaw: Éditions Scientifiques de Pologne 1972.
- S. Jakobielski, The inscriptions, ostraca and graffiti [w:] Soba, Archaeological Research at a Medieval Capital on the Blue Nile, Memoirs of the BIEA, red. D.A. Welsby, C.M. Daniels, nr 12, London 1991, p. 274–296.
- S. Jakobielski, Das Kloster der Heiligen Dreifaltigkeit. Bauphasen des nordwestlichen Anbaus [w:] Dongola-Studien, 35 Jahre polnischer Forschungen im Zentrum des makuritischen Reiches, red. S. Jakobielski, P. Scholz, "Bibliotheca nubica et aethiopica" vol. 7, Warszawa-Wiesbaden, 2001, p. 141–168.
- S. Jakobielski, La liste des évêques de Pakhoras, "Études et Travaux" 1, 1965, p. 151–170.
- S. Jakobielski, The Monastery in Old Dongola: Excavation of the North-Western Annexe 1998–2002, "Gdansk Archaeological Museum African Reports", 2005
- S. Jakobielski, Nubia w okresie chrześcijańskim [w:] Historia Afryki. Do początku XIX wieku, edited by M. Tymowski, Wrocław, Warszawa, Kraków 1996, p. 545–569.
- S. Jakobielski, Nubian Christian Architecture, "Zeitschrift für Ägyptische Sprache und Altertumskunde", Bd. 108,1981, p. 33–48.
- S. Jakobielski, Nubian Scenes of Protection from Faras as an Aid to Dating, "Études et Travaux", 2007
- S. Jakobielski, M. Martens-Czarnecka, Old Dongola Fieldwork – Seasons 2005/2006 and 2006, Polish Archaeology in Mediterranean 18 (2008)
- S. Jakobielski, Old Dongola, Fieldwork 2004, Polish Archaeology in the Mediterranean 16 (2006)
- S. Jakobielski, Portraits of the Bishops of Faras [in:] Nubian Studies, Proceedings of the Symposium for Nubian Studies, Selwyn College, Cambridge, 1978, red. J. M. Plumley, Warminster 1982, p. 127–133.
- S. Jakobielski, Remarques sur la chronologie des peintures murales de Faras aux VIIIe et IXe siècles [w:] Nubia Christiana I, ed. S. Jakobielski, Warsaw 1982, p. 142–172.
- S. Jakobielski, Some Remarks on Faras Inscriptions [w:] Kunst und Geschichte Nubiens in christlicher Zeit, red. E. Dinkler, Recklinghausen 1970, p. 29–39.
- S. Jakobielski, Two Coptic Foundation Stones from Faras [w:] Mélanges offerts à Kazimierz Michałowski, éd. M. L. Bernhardt, Warszawa 1966, p. 103–109
- S. Jakobielski, J. van der Vliet, From Aswan to Dongola: The Epitaph of Bishop Joseph (died AD 668)* [w:] Nubian Voices. Studies in Christian Nubian Culture, red. A. Łajtar, J. van der Vliet, Warsaw 2011, p. 15–37
- Katalog rękopisów orientalnych ze zbiorów polskich, t. 4: Katalog rękopisów egipskich, koptyjskich i etiopskich, ed. S. Strelcyn, Warsaw: PWN 1960.
- M. Łaptaś, S. Jakobielski, „Unknown” Mural of the Three Youths in a Fiery Furnace from the Faras Cathedral [w:] Ars Graeca – Ars Latina, Studia dedykowane Profesor Annie Różyckiej-Bryzek, ed. W. Bulsza, L. Sadko, Kraków 2001, p. 75–85.
- Polskie wykopaliska w Starej Dongoli: 45 lat współpracy archeologicznej z Sudanem, Stefan Jakobielski, Małgorzata Martens-Czarnecka, translated by Barbara Gostyńska, Wiesław Piątkiewicz, Mahmud El. Tayeb, Warsaw: National Museum, 2006.
