= Faras Cathedral =

Cathedral in the Lower Nubian city of Faras (Sudan)

Coordinates: 22.1817°N 31.4969°E

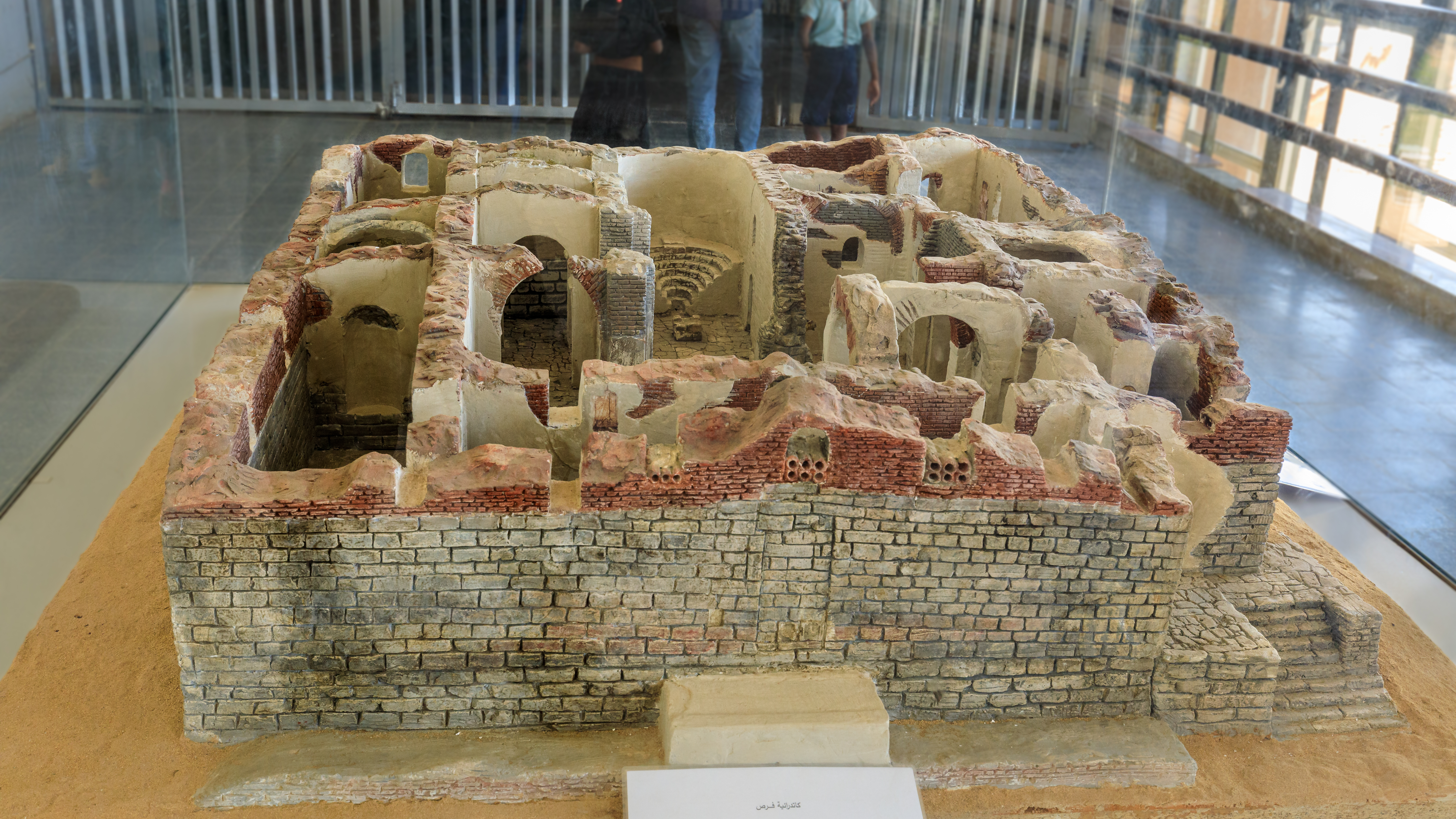
Model of the ruins of the Cathedral of Faras

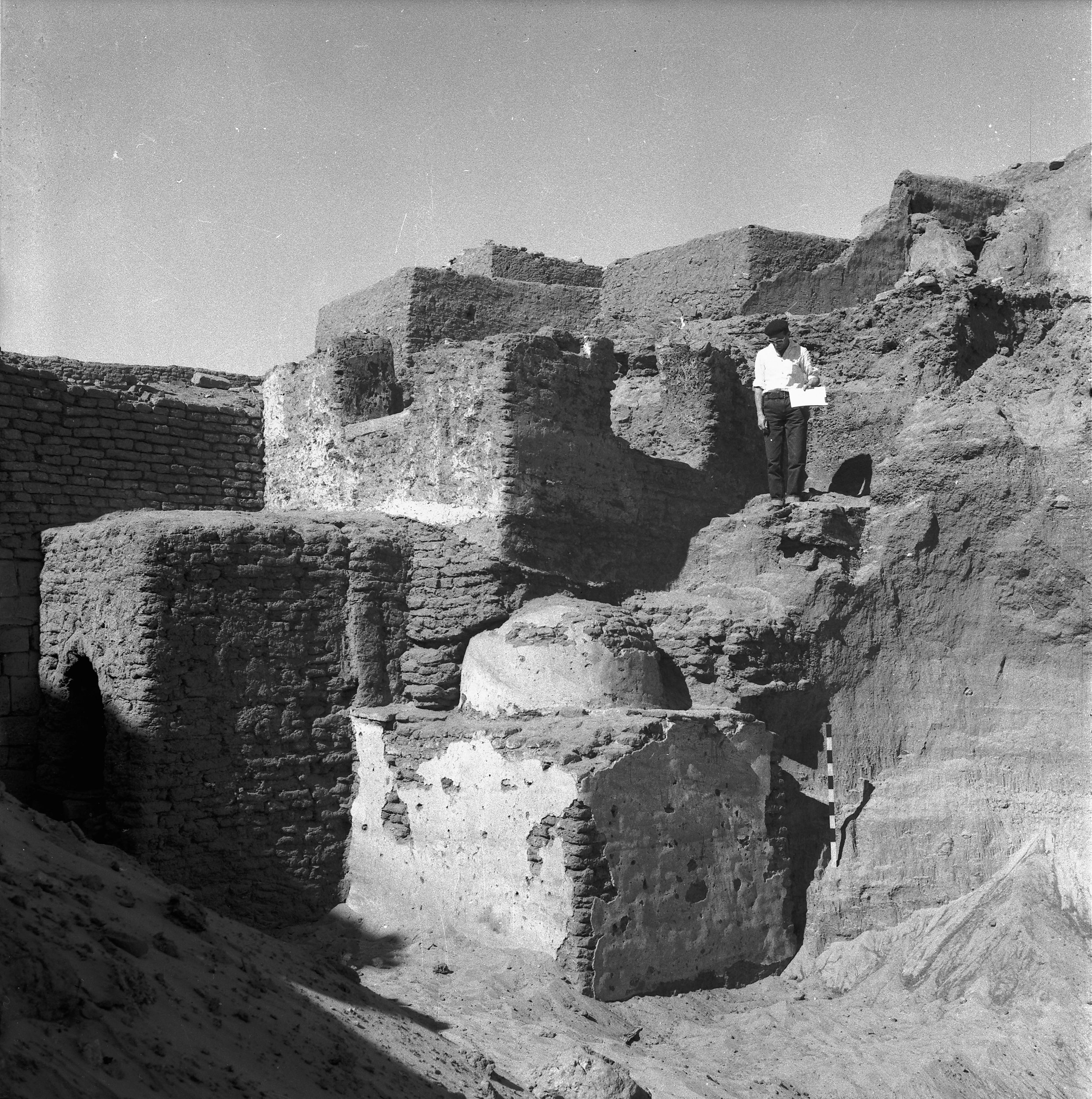
Eastern facade of the cathedral

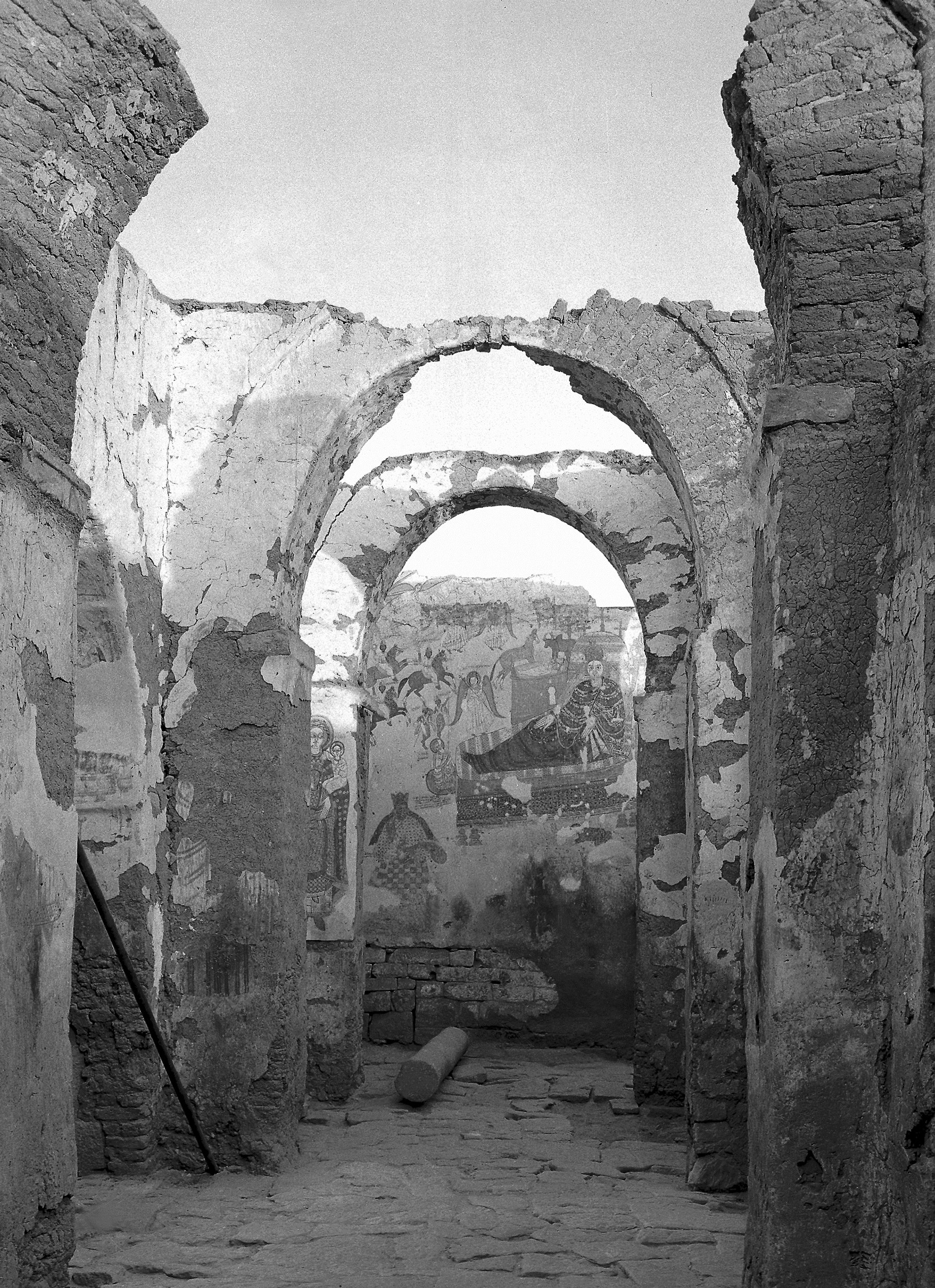
Northern nave

Faras Cathedral was a cathedral in the Lower Nubian city of Faras. It was the original seat of the Diocese of Faras.

Nobadian rulers controlling the Nile Valley from the first to the third cataracts converted to Christianity around 548 AD influenced by missionaries sent from Constantinople by the Empress Theodora. The first cathedral was erected in the 7th century, when the city was still known as Pachoras, and likely stood at the exact site where Polish archaeologists taking part in the Nubia Campaign discovered the subsequent 8th-century cathedral. The site was excavated by Polish archaeologists under Kazimierz Michałowski between 1960 and 1964.

Its wall paintings were salvaged prior to the flooding of Lake Nasser and are today on display in the Polish National Museum in Warsaw in the Faras Gallery and in the Sudan National Museum in Khartoum. In addition, a major pottery works was found.

== See also ==
- Bishop Petros with Saint Peter the Apostle
- Saint Anne (wall painting)
