= Timothy of Faras =

Timothy (Coptic: Ϯⲙⲟⲑⲉⲟⲥ, Timotheos) was a Nubian monk and bishop. He was the titular bishop of Faras (Pachoras) with his seat in Qasr Ibrim (Phrim) from 1372.

Timothy was a hegoumenos (leader of a monastic community) before he became a bishop.

An account of Timothy's enthronement as bishop was discovered on a pair of paper scrolls in his tomb underneath his body. Each scroll contains the same five letters, one in Coptic (with a few lines of Greek) and the other in Arabic. The first letter, written by Patriarch Gabriel IV of Alexandria, informs the Nubians that Timothy has been chosen to replace the late bishop Athanasios. The other four letters were all written by bishops, two by witnesses of Timothy's ordination and another two by witnesses of his consecration and enthronement. The Coptic scroll is the only example of Bohairic dialect of Coptic from medieval Nubia.

The scrolls show that the Nubian church continued to be subject to the Coptic Church into the late fourteenth century. It is the last such evidence. Gabriel IV informs the people of Faras and Qasr Ibrim that he has elected Timothy because it was God's will "to summon for you a bishop in the place of Abba Athanasios your father." He was ordained in the Hanging Church at Cairo, where he took on "the garments of priesthood". He was then consecrated by Gabriel in the church of Saint Victor at Qamula among the monasteries of Naqada. Four Coptic bishops who witnessed the consecration signed the document. Among them were Athanasius of Qus, Michael of Atrib and Mark of Qift.

Although Timothy used the title bishop of Faras (Pachoras), his real seat was at Qasr Ibrim. It is unlikely that he even visited Faras. His date of death is unknown, but it appears to have been not long after his arrival in Qasr Ibrim. It is not certain if he was still alive in 1374. He is the last known Nubian bishop of Faras. He was buried in the north crypt of the cathedral of Qasr Ibrim on top of his scrolls and beneath an iron staff topped with a cross.

Timothy was not buried in his vestments but in everyday clothes, perhaps his travelling clothes. These consisted of cotton trousers, a linen tunic and a blue woolen cloak with a hood, the hem of the cloak and the lining of the hood being turquoise silk. A tapestry panel 27 centimetres (11 in) by 101 centimetres (40 in) in white, yellow, black and blue was sewn onto the back of the cloak. He also had a linen handkerchief with blue and white silk accents. The scrolls are today kept in the Coptic Museum, while the burial clothes are in the British Museum.

== Bibliography ==
- Adams, Nettie K.; Webb, William S. (2002). "Silk in Ancient Nubia: One Road, Many Sources". Textile Society of America Symposium Proceedings (497): 81–91.
- Adams, William Y. (1977). Nubia: Corridor to Africa. Princeton University Press.
- Beckingham, C. F. (1977). "Review of Plumley 1975". Bulletin of the School of Oriental and African Studies. 40 (1): 213. doi:10.1017/s0041977x0004115x. S2CID 162194548.
- Dzierżykray-Rogalski, Tadeusz (1985). The Bishops of Faras: An Anthropological-Medical Study. Éditions scientifiques de Pologne.
- Jakobielski, Stefan (1972). A History of the Bishopric of Pachoras on the Basis of Coptic Inscriptions. Éditions scientifiques de Pologne.
- Lobban, Richard A. (2020). Historical Dictionary of Medieval Christian Nubia. Rowman and Littlefield.
- Plumley, J. Martin (1964). "Qaṣr Ibrim̂ 1963–1964". Journal of Egyptian Archaeology. 50: 3–5. doi:10.2307/3855736. JSTOR 3855736.
- Plumley, J. Martin (1975). The Scrolls of Bishop Timotheos: Two Documents from Medieval Nubia. London: Egyptian Exploration Society.
- Ruffini, Giovanni R. (2012). Medieval Nubia: A Social and Economic History. Oxford University Press.
- Szymańska, Agnieszka E. (2010). Liminal Bishops: Episcopal Portraits from the Cathedral of Pachoras, Nubia (Master's thesis). Temple University. ProQuest 1479039
- Youssef, Youhanna Nessim (2010). "Athanasius of Qus and His Time". In Gawdat Gabra; Hany N. Takla (eds.). Christianity and Monasticism in Upper Egypt. Vol. 2. The American University in Cairo Press. pp. 171–180.
