= Diocese of Faras =

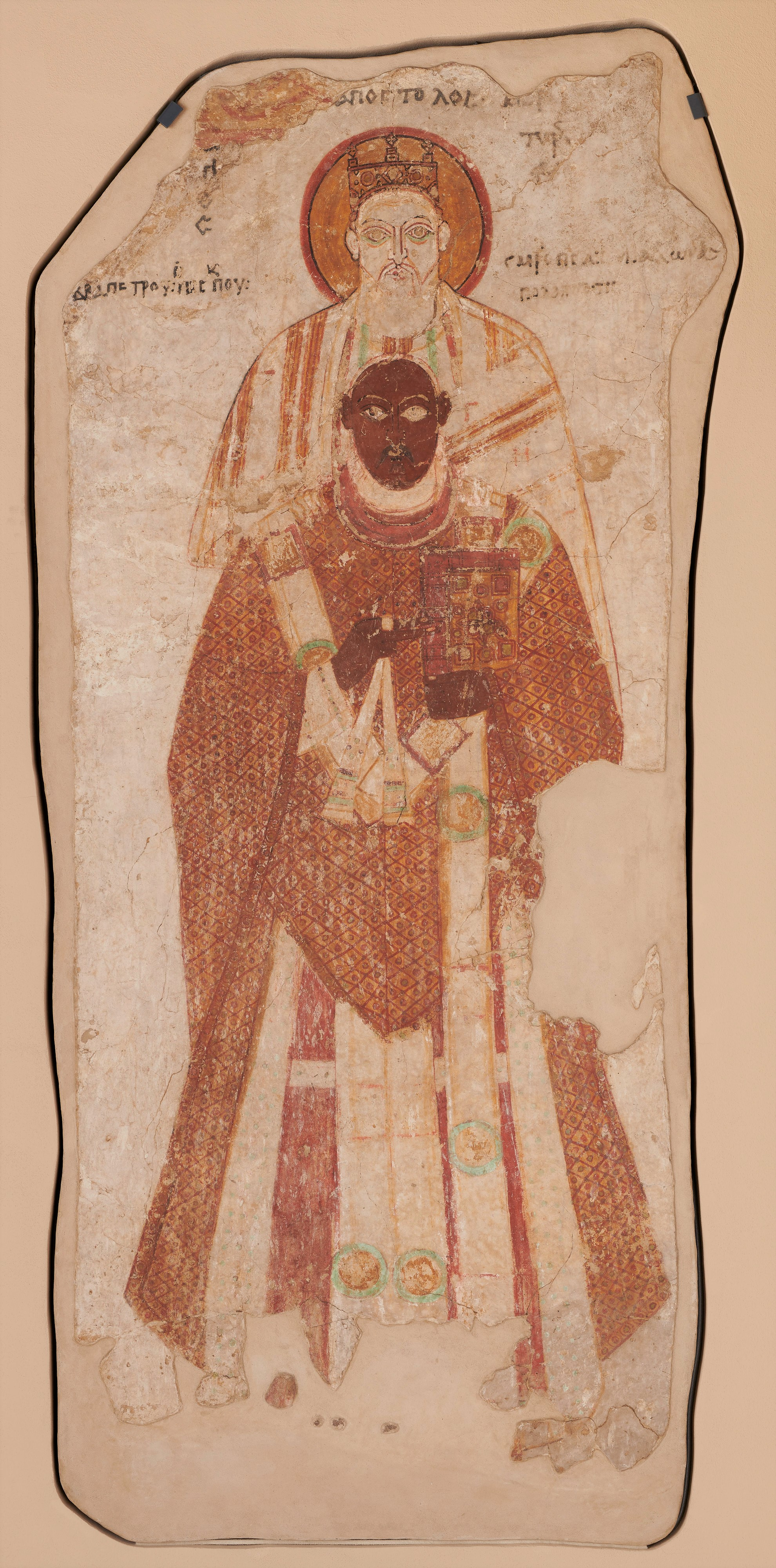
Bishop Petros with Saint Peter the Apostle, wall painting from the Faras Cathedral (National Museum in Warsaw).

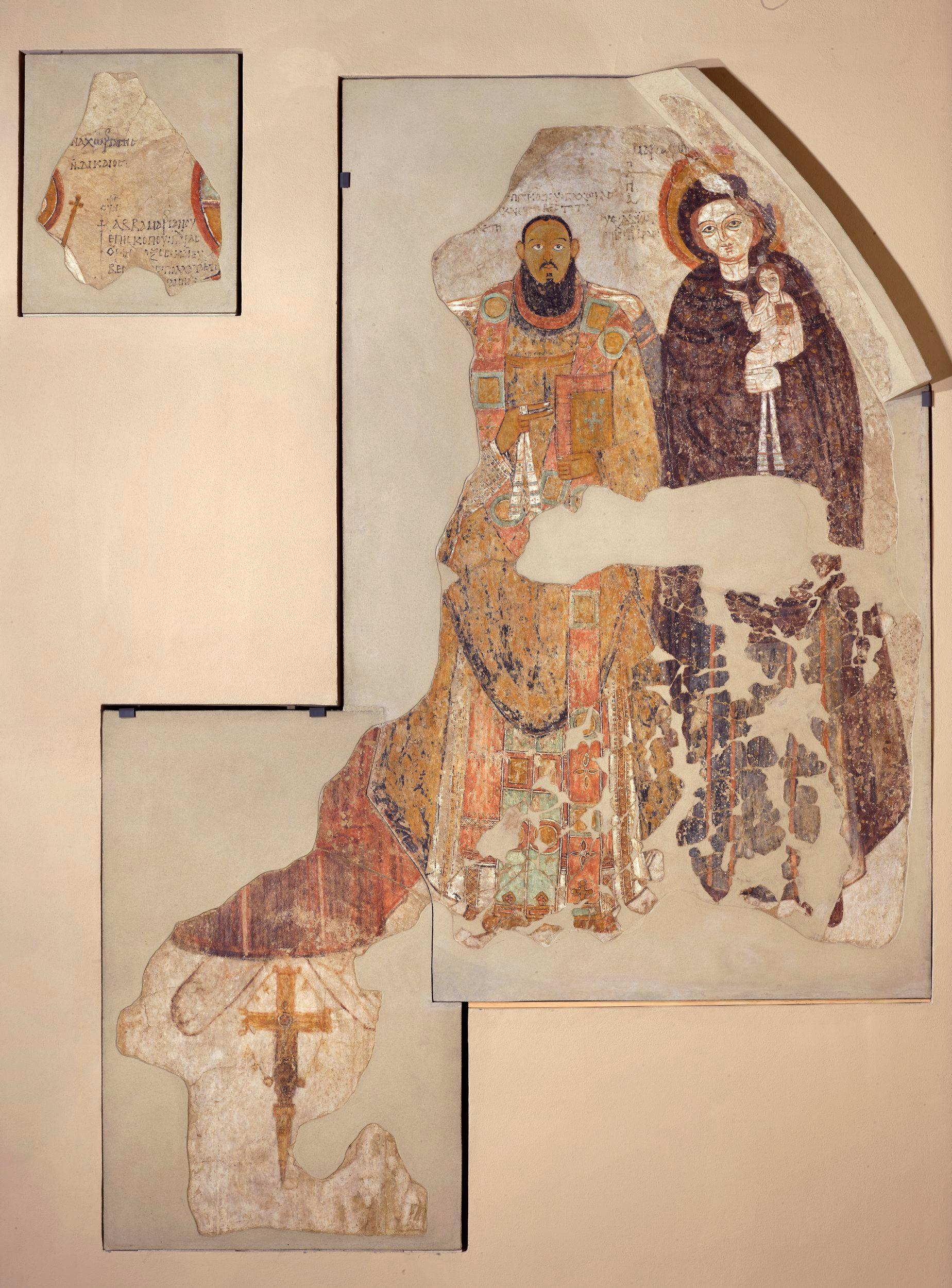
Bishop Marianos of Pakhoras supported by Madonna and Child, as depicted in the wall painting from the Faras Cathedral (National Museum in Warsaw).

The Diocese of Faras was a Christian bishopric in Nobadia during the Middle Ages and is today a titular see of the Coptic Orthodox Church. Its seat was originally at Faras (Pakhoras). Later, its bishops sat at Qasr Ibrim.

Despite Faras's submersion following the building of the Aswan High Dam, the see is still claimed by the Coptic church's Titular Bishop of the Great and Ancient Metropolis of Nubia, who is styled Bishop of Faras of Nobatia.

== Bishops of Pakhoras ==
- Aetios, c. 620
- Sarapion
- Vacant during invasion of Nobadia and Makouria by the Caliphate
- Pilatos, late 7th century
- Paulos, a Miaphysite, died 709 or 719
- Mena, a Miaphysite, died 730
- Matthaios (Old Nubian: Maththaios), died 31 May 766
- Ignatios, died 23 January 802
- Ioannes I, died 809 (?)
- Ioannes II
- Markos, c. 820
- Khael I, died 827 (?)
- Thomas, a Miaphysite, 827-862, died 16 July 862
- Iesu I (Old Nubian: Iesou), died 866

== Metropolitans of Pakhoras ==
- Kyros, a Miaphysite, died 902
- Andreas, died 903 (not a metropolitan bishop?)
- Kollutwos, a Miaphysite, died 13 August 923
- Stephanos, a Miaphysite, died 14 July 926
- Elias, a Miaphysite, died 6 August 952
- Aaron (Old Nubian: Aron), a Miaphysite, died 12 December 972
- Petros I, a Miaphysite, died 20 July 999

== Bishops of Pakhoras ==
- Ioannes III, died 21 September 1005
- Marianos, former archimandrite of Puke, died 11 November 1036
- Merkurios (Old Nubian: Merkourios), died 1 July 1056
- Unknown
- Petros II, a Miaphysite, died 22 May 1062
- Georgios, a Miaphysite, died 14 August 1097
- Khael II, died 5 May 1130
- Iesu II (Old Nubian: Iesou), died 4 June 1175
- Unknown
- Tamer, died 31 March 1193 (?)
- Unknown
- Timotheos, a Miaphysite, "Bishop of Phrim and Pakhoras," resident at Primnis, consecrated in 1372

== See also ==
- Holy Synod of the Coptic Church

== Sources ==
- Jakobielski, S. A Chronology of the Bishops of Faras.
- Michalowski, K. FARAS.
