= Ursula Hintze =

German archaeologist

- Born: Ursula Büttner; 1918
- Died: 1989
- Spouse: Fritz Hintze
- Scientific career
- Fields: Archaeology

Ursula Hintze (née Büttner) was a German archaeologist and Africanist. She was one of the first researchers to document the Kushite graffiti at Musawwarat es-Sufra. Her catalog of graffiti has been digitized since 2007.

Her husband was German archaeologist Fritz Hintze.

== See also ==
- Kwa languages

== Books ==
- Hintze, Ursula (1959). "Bibliographie der Kwa-Sprachen und der Sprachen der Togo-Restvölker". Bibliographie der Kwa-Sprachen und der Sprachen der Togo-Restvölker (in German). De Gruyter. doi:10.1515/9783112610329. ISBN 978-3-11-261032-9.
- Hintze, Fritz; Hintze, Ursula (1966). Alte Kulturen im Sudan (in German). Callwey.
- Hintze, Fritz; Hintze, Ursula (1968). Civilization of the Old Sudan: Kerma, Kush, Christian Nubia.
