= Qasr Ibrim =

Archaeological site in Egypt

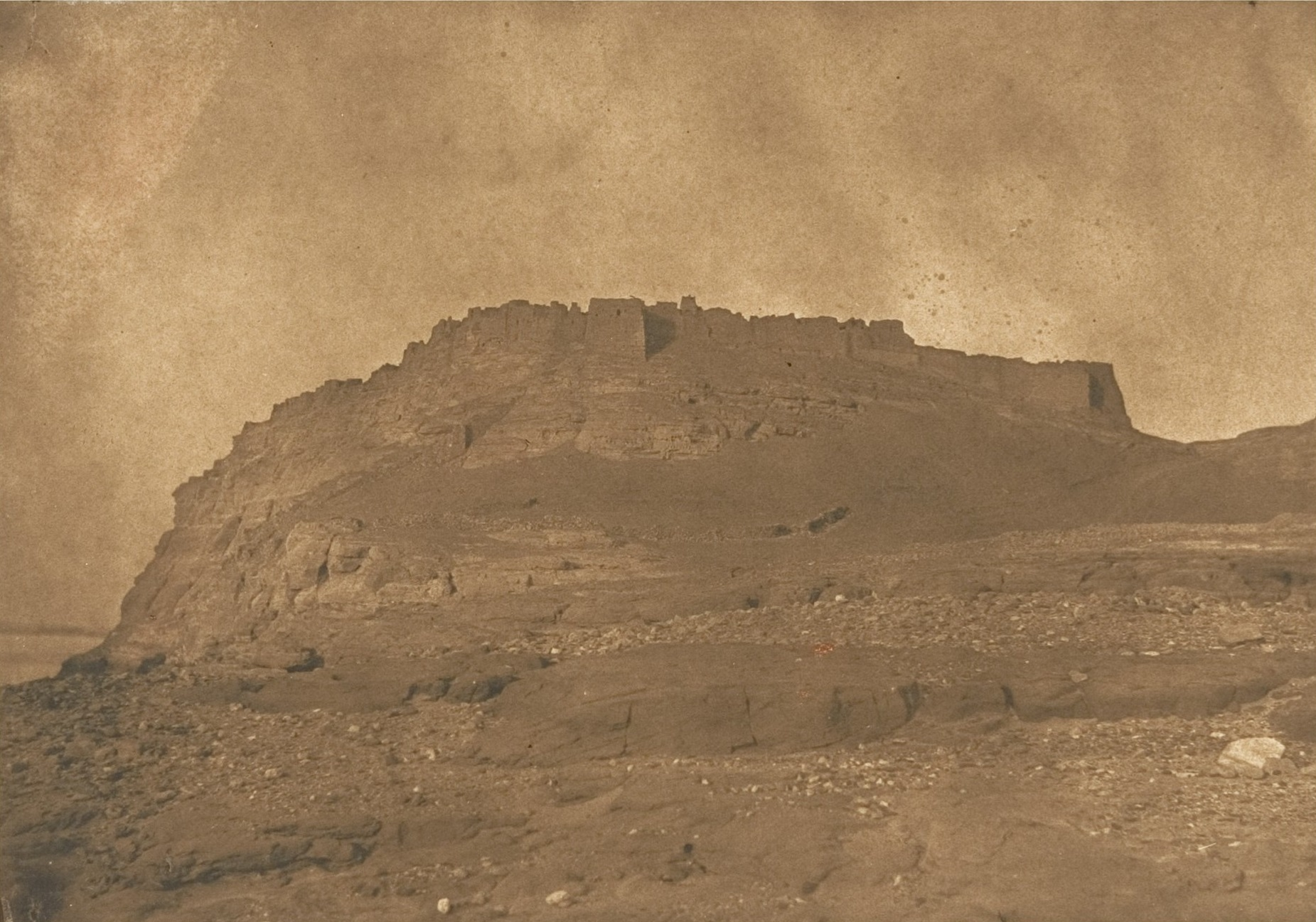
- Photo of Qasr Ibrim from the south, 1850

- Location of Qasr Ibrim
- 22°38′59″N 31°59′34″E
- Location: Egypt

Qasr Ibrim (Arabic: قصر ابريم; Meroitic: Pedeme; Old Nubian: ⲥⲓⲗⲙⲓ, Silmi; Coptic: ⲡⲣⲓⲙ, Prim; Ancient Greek: Πρῖμις, Prímis; Latin: Primis) is an archaeological site in Lower Nubia, located in the modern country of Egypt. The site has a long history of occupation, ranging from as early as the eighth century BC to AD 1813, and was an economic, political, and religious center. Originally it was a major city perched on a cliff above the Nile, but the flooding of Lake Nasser after the construction of the Aswan High Dam – with the related International Campaign to Save the Monuments of Nubia – transformed it into an island and flooded its outskirts. Qasr Ibrim is the only major archaeological site in Lower Nubia to have survived the Aswan Dam floods. Both prior to and after the floods, it has remained a major site for archaeological investigations.

== History ==
=== Pre-history and ancient era ===
Human habitation at the site dates from the Late Period of ancient Egypt, but it reached its greatest prominence in the Middle Ages, when the area was the home of the Eparch of Nobatia. Qasr Ibrim is the source of the largest collection of Old Nubian documents ever found, including the records of the Eparch. The site was occupied until 1813, when the last occupants were driven out by artillery fire. Today the island is closed to all but archaeologists.

Egypt's influence in Nubia began around 2,000 BC, when Egyptian invaded and claimed sovereignty over the area. Many Egyptian artifacts and evidence of Egyptian architecture have been found at Qasr Ibrim. The earliest inscription at the site is a stela, a stone or wooden slab, from the reign of Amenhotep I. The stela was found in a now-ruined Christian Byzantine cathedral at Qasr Ibrim where it had been reused in one of the church's crypts. The stela is now located in the British Museum.

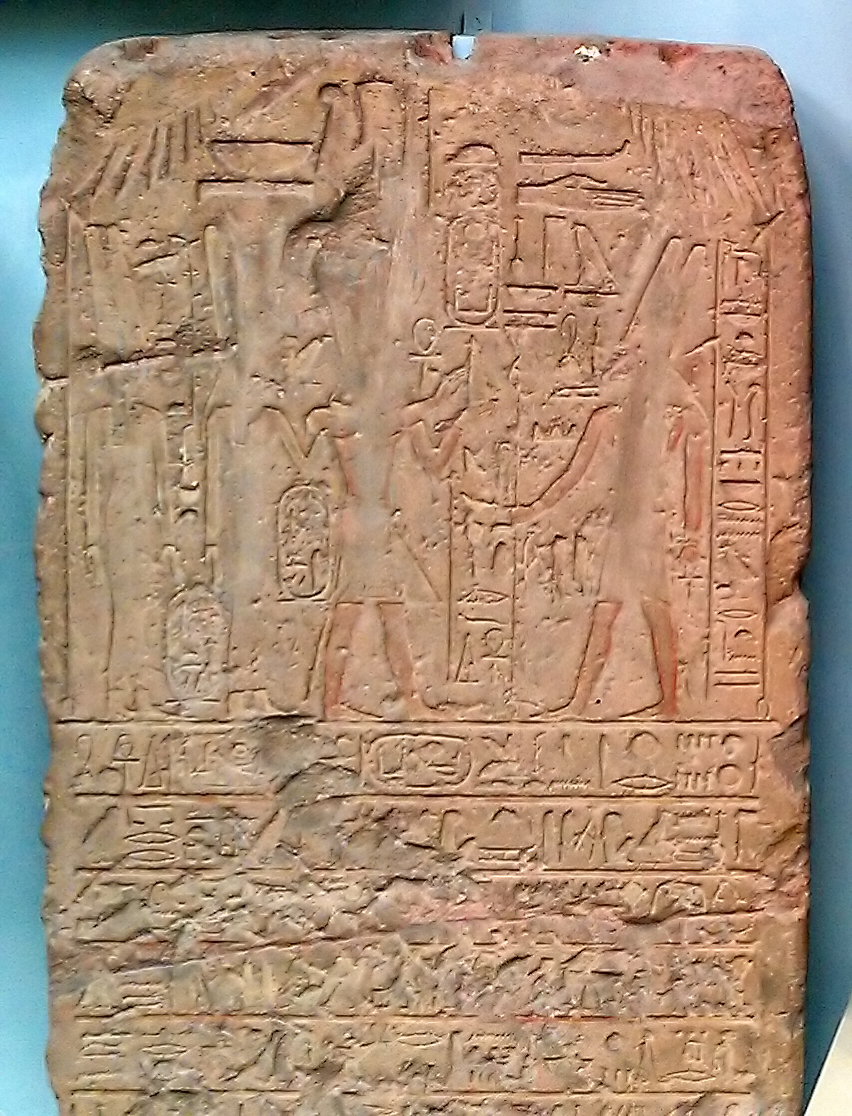
Sandstone Stela Dated to Year 8 of Pharaoh Amenhotep I (~1530 BC, 18th Dynasty, from Qasr Ibrim) - British Museum.

The site was partly rebuilt "under the prefecture of Gaius Petronius during Augustus' reign." Qasr Ibrim played a key role in Rome's defense of the Aswan region, and was likely held until AD 100 or later. The fortress, constructed by Roman military engineers, was the strongest in the Nile Valley at this time.

=== Early Christian age ===
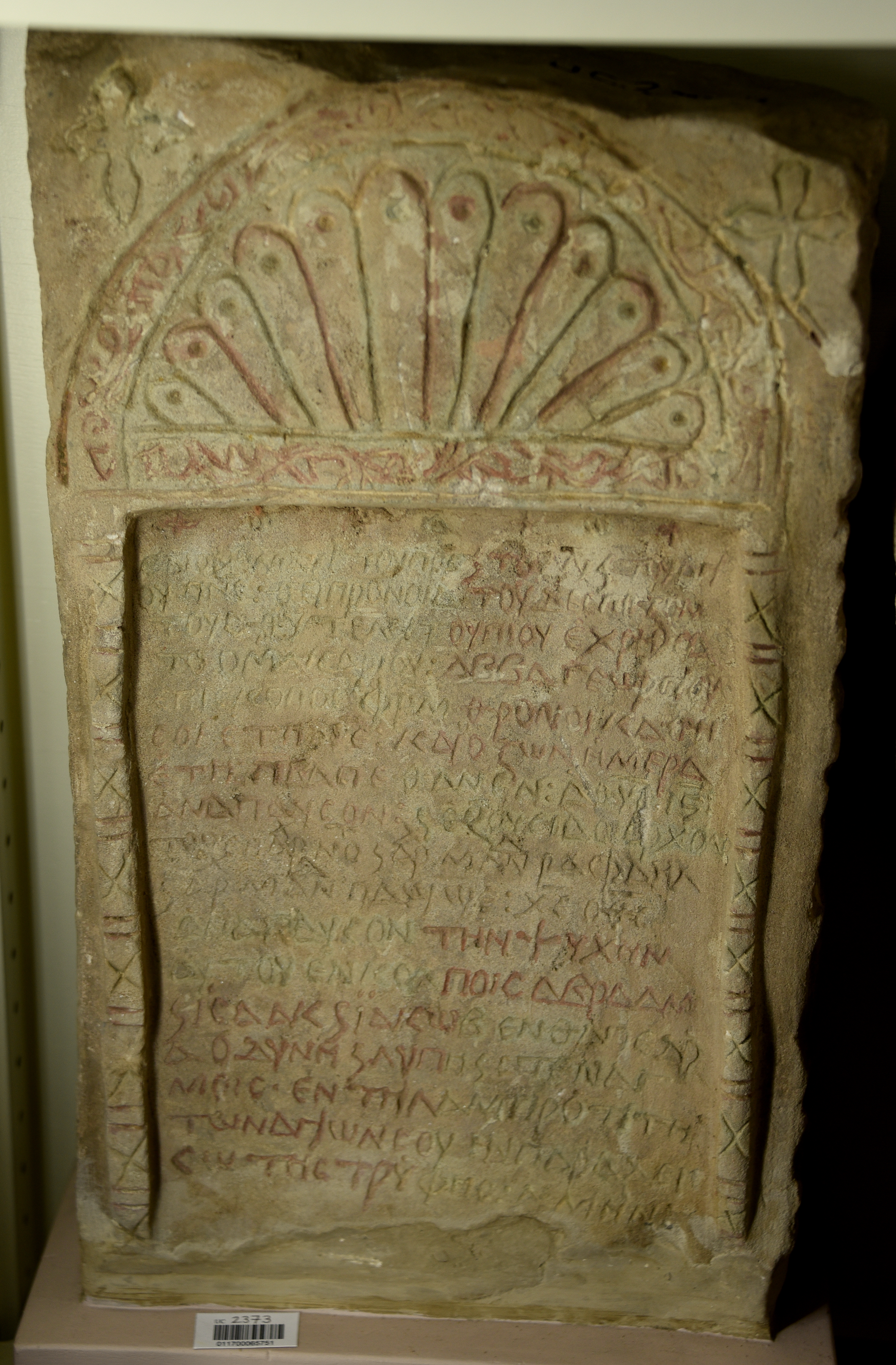
Stela of Georgios, bishop of Ibrim, 10th to 11th century, currently housed in the Petrie Museum.

During Roman times the town was one of the last bastions of paganism, its six temples converting to Christianity two centuries later than the rest of Egypt. It then became one of the main Christian centers in Lower Nubia. Christianity first came to Qasr Ibrim in the 6th century, but had little effect. It wasn't until the city became part of the kingdom of Makuria, in the early 8th century, that Qasr Ibrim became a center for Christianity. This continued even through the fifteenth century when the Makurian kingdom became Islamic. The city held out against Islam until the 16th century, when a unit of Bosnian soldiers, part of the Ottoman army, occupied the site. The Bosnian soldiers stayed on and eventually married into the local Nubian community, using part of the cathedral as a mosque.

Two churches remain on the site. The Taharqa Church was most likely built between 542 and 580, which would make it one of Nubia's earliest churches. Like many of the earliest churches in Nubia, it would have been constructed within the walls of the already present temples. Qasr Ibrim's cathedral was built later, though the date of construction in unclear. Archaeologists currently believe it was constructed in the first half of the eighth century.

The last known Nubian bishop of Faras, Timothy, actually resided at Qasr Ibrim. He was buried in the cathedral there (c. 1375) and two scrolls were discovered in his tomb.

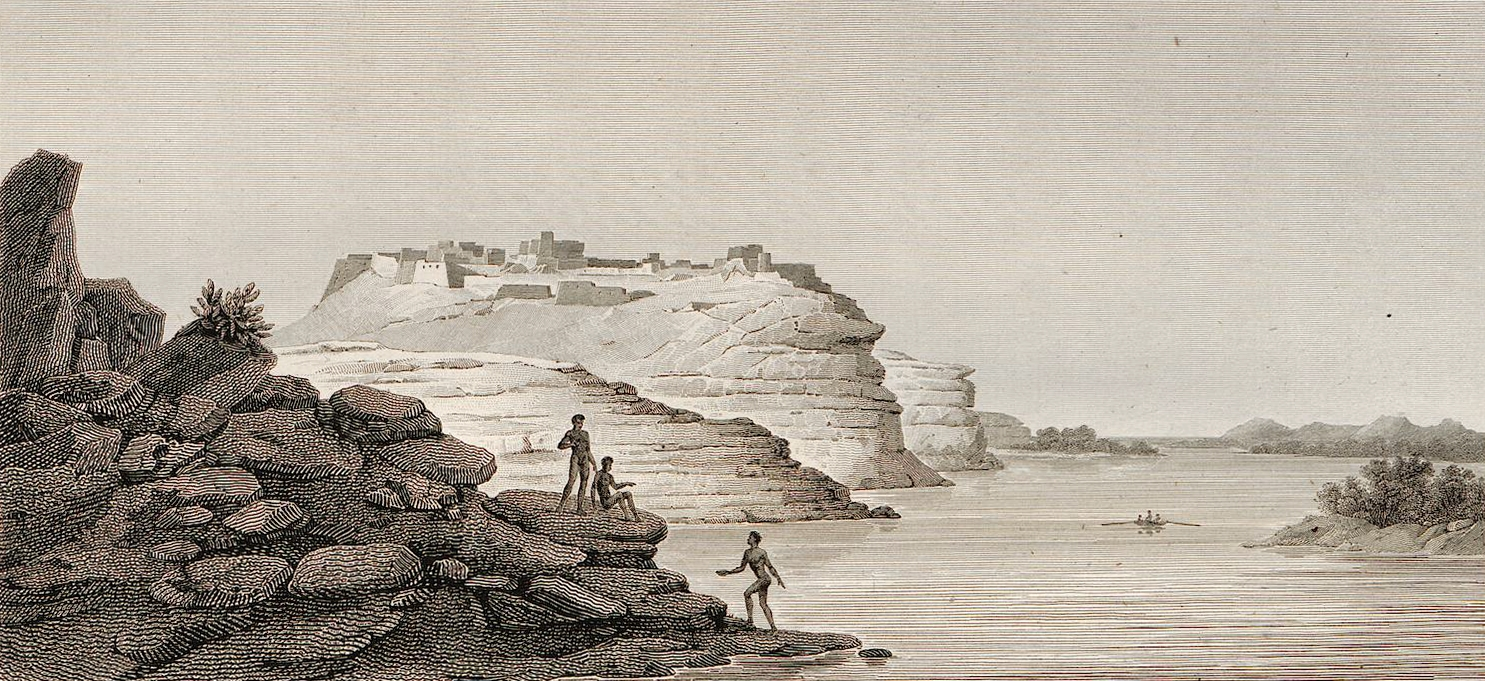
Drawing of Qasr Ibrim from the north, 1819

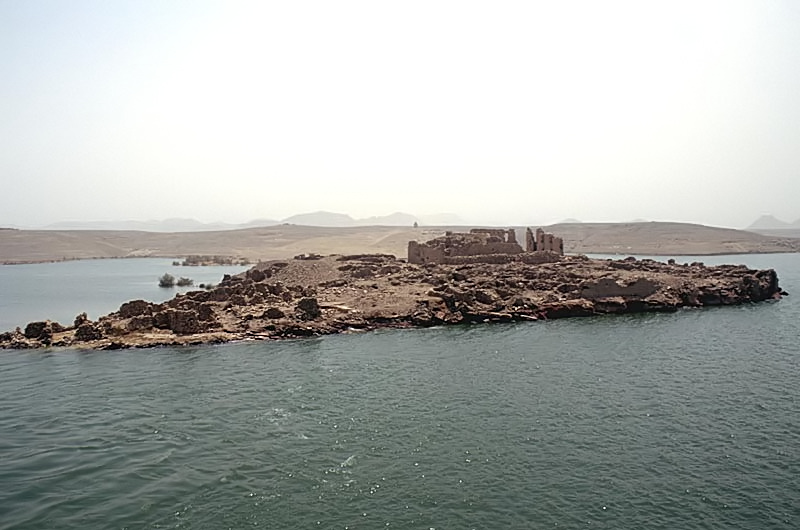
Island of Qasr Ibrim in the Lake Nasser.

== Archaeology ==
The site was first excavated by David Randall-MacIver and C. Leonard Woolley for the Eckley B. Coxe Expedition for the University of Pennsylvania in 1911. In 1963, excavations were started by the Egyptian Exploration Society and have continued periodically to the present day. Cemeteries found east and west of the main settlement were excavated in 1932 and 1961. There are still areas around the complex that have yet to be excavated, although some sites, including those near the river, were destroyed in floods caused by the Aswan Dam.

=== Evidence for plant and animal use ===
The almost rainless conditions of the area have created excellent preservation of organic materials. Pottery dated to the post-Meroitic period (AD 350–600) shows evidence of both date palm and doum palm residues. Various samples of sorghum dating from between 800 BC to AD 1800 have also been found at Qasr Ibrim. There are four forms of sorghum that are found on the site. From when the site was settled until around AD 100 only wild sorghum can be found. From AD 100 until around 1500 an early form of cultivated sorghum (Sorghum bicolor, ssp. bicolor, race Bicolor) is found. Around 1200 an advanced form of sorghum (Sorghum bicolor, ssp. bicolor, race Durra) appears. Between the 5th and 7th centuries a transitional race is also present.

There are believed to be three phases of agricultural history, the Napatan occupation, the Roman occupation, and the Meroitic periods. Listed below are the main crops that have been identified in each phase:

Napatan (mid 8th - mid 7th century BC):

- emmer wheat (Triticum turgidum L.)
- hulled barley (Hordeum vulgare L.)
- broomcorn millet (Panicum miliaceum L.)
- flax (Linum usitatissimum L.)

Roman (25 BC - mid 1st century AD):

- emmer wheat (Triticum turgidum L.)
- hulled barley (Hordeum vulgare L.)
- broomcorn millet (Panicum miliaceum L.)
- flax (Linum usitatissimum L.)
- cotton (Gossypium sp.)

Meroitic (AD 100–300):

- sorghum (Sorghum bicolor)
- hulled barley (Hordeum vulgare L.)
- durum wheat (Triticum turgidum ssp. turgidum)
- bread wheat (Triticum aestivum)

The site has also revealed many archaeozoological remains, though they have not been as heavily studied as the botanical remains. Evidence of a heavily sheep and goat based economy has been found, along with large numbers of juvenile cattle. These cattle remains suggest a meat- and milk-based economy. The cattle could also have been used for religious ceremonies at the Meroitic Temple. The ritually-deposited remains of a domesticated chicken were also found below a house floor, and date to the post-Meroitic period (late 5th to early 6th centuries AD).

=== Artifacts ===
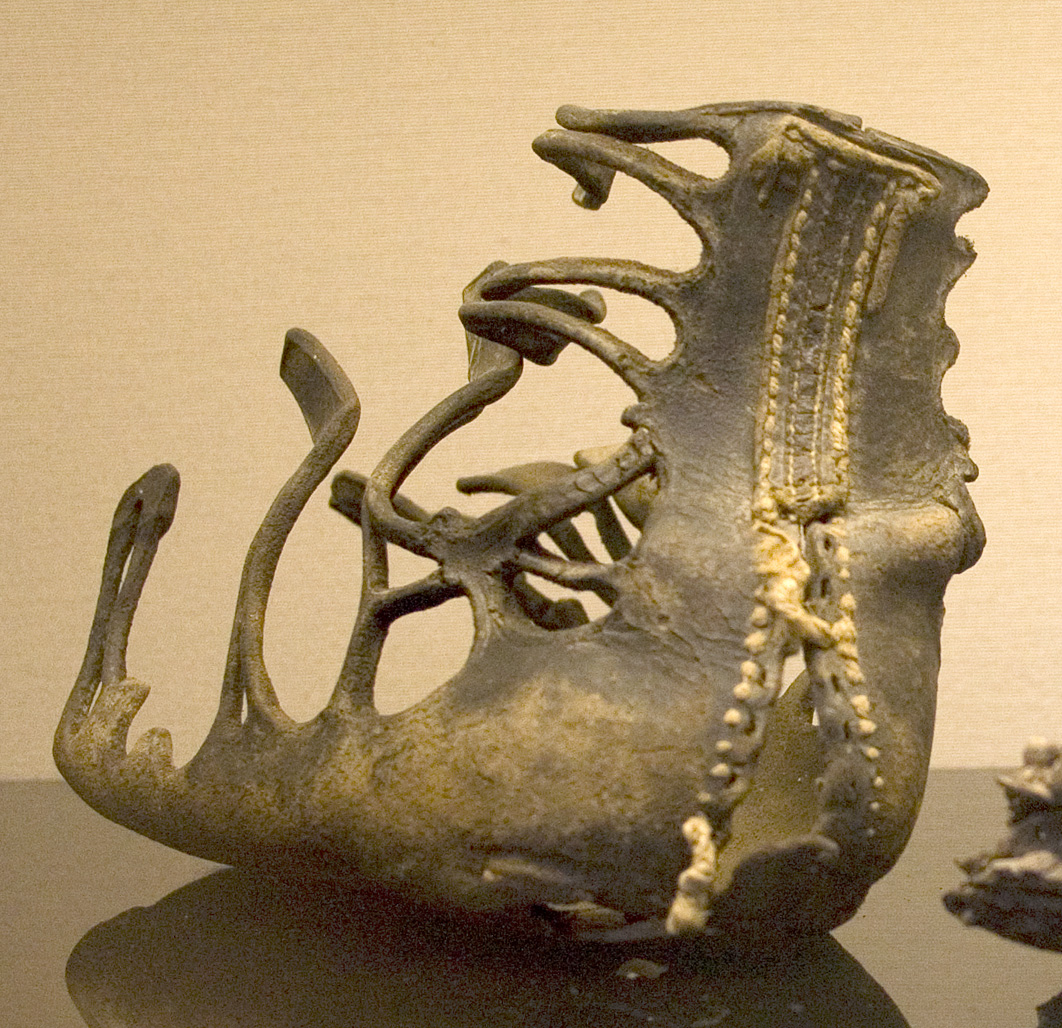
Original Roman caliga, found at Qasr Ibrim, Egypt. 1st century BC – 1st century AD. British Museum, room 65.

Qasr Ibrim is known not only for its organic remains but also for the textiles that have also been found at the site. During the Roman occupation of the site, sandals, textiles, and leather fragments were left behind. Woolen fabrics are believed to have been brought to Qasr Ibrim in 23 BC by the Romans. Cotton fabrics were not introduced until the first century AD by the Meroitic peoples. The un-dyed Meroitic fabrics differ from the wool of the Romans, which has been found in blues and other bright colors.

The conditions at Qasr Ibrim have also preserved a large number of documents in nine different languages or scripts. This includes hieroglyphics, Demotic, Meroitic, Greek, Latin, Coptic, Old Nubian, Arabic, and Turkish. Earlier documents were written on papyrus, though parchment was the preferred material for religious texts. Paper was not common writing material in Nubia until the twelfth century. A variety of texts were found, including personal letters and religious documents. These documents show the significance of Qasr Ibrim as a frontier society, and the center of a vast trade network.

== See also ==
- List of ancient Egyptian sites
