= Bishop Petros with Saint Peter the Apostle =

Nubian Christian wall painting

- Biskup Petros ze świętym Piotrem Apostołem (Polish)
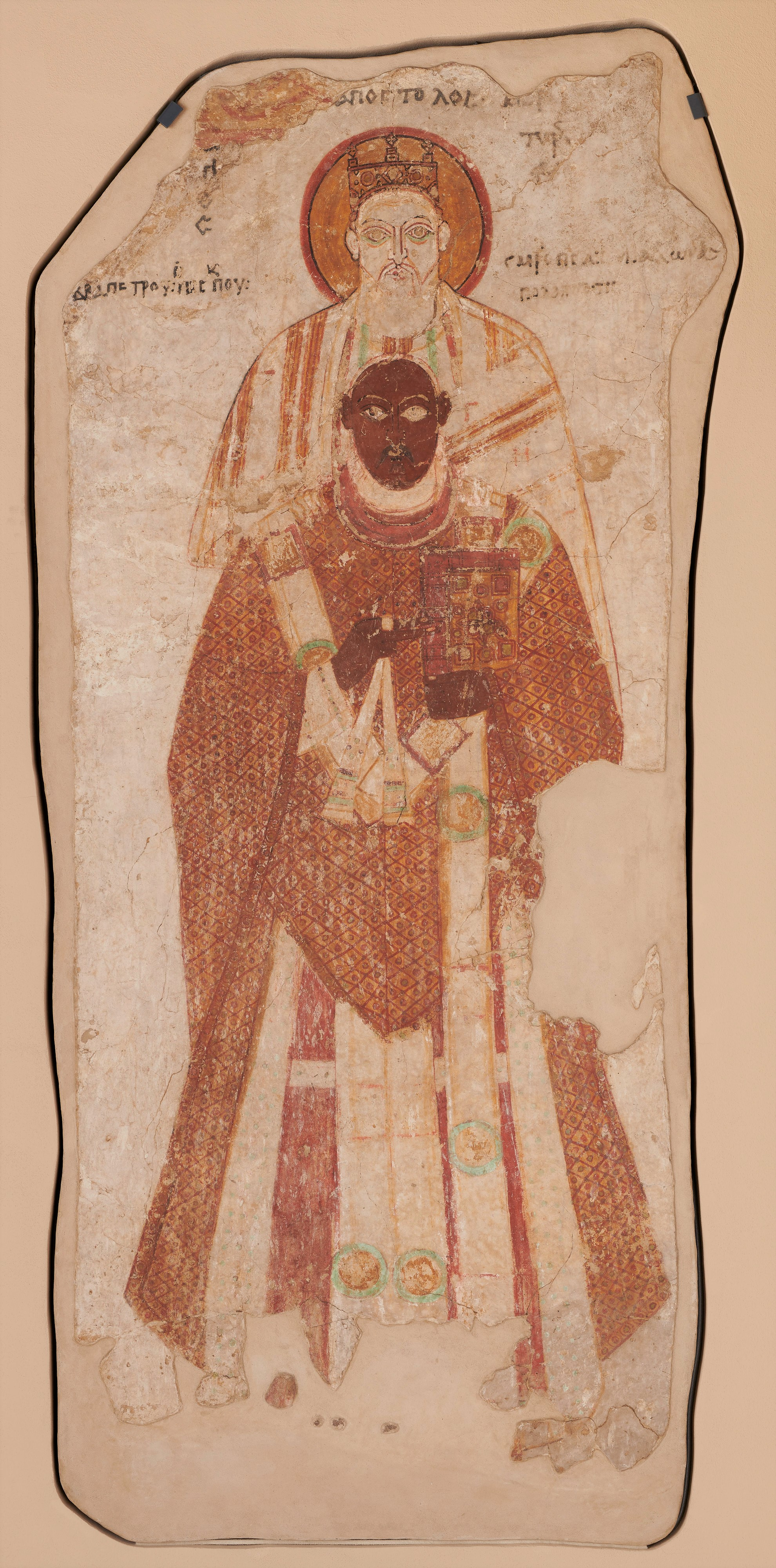
- Artist: Unknown
- Year: Last quarter of 10th century (before 999)
- Type: Wall painting
- Medium: Tempera on silt plaster
- Subject: Bishop Petros and Saint Peter
- Dimensions: 240 cm × 101 cm (94 in × 40 in)
- Location: National Museum; Warsaw
- Owner: National Museum
- Accession: 234031
- Website: cyfrowe.mnw.art.pl/dmuseion/docmetadata?id=32813

Bishop Petros with Saint Peter the Apostle (Polish: Biskup Petros ze świętym Piotrem Apostołem) is a Nubian Christian wall painting from the last quarter of the 10th century. Made with tempera on silt plaster using a secco technique, it depicts Petros, the bishop of Faras between 974 and 997. The anonymous work was discovered in the ruins of Faras Cathedral, an important religious centre of Nubia, in modern Sudan. Rescued from flooding when Lake Nasser was created, since 1964 it is part of the Faras Gallery of the National Museum in Warsaw.

The painting, which used to be part of a larger composition, representing King Georgios II of Makuria with the Virgin and Child, was painted on the west wall of the chapel located in the southern nave of the cathedral. The portrait of the bishop was placed to the right of the image of the king. The representation of the two highest hierarchs of the state along with their patron saints indicated the supernatural origin of the power of the nobles and symbolized the unity of the clerical and secular power.

The image was created in Petros' lifetime, which is suggested by the inscription in Greek accompanying the painting, wishing him "many years [of life]". The painting is considered one of the most precious images of Nubian officials found in the Cathedral of Faras and is also one of six best preserved portraits of bishops discovered there.

== History ==
The painting, like most other pieces of Nubian art in the Faras Gallery of the National Museum in Warsaw, was recovered by Polish archaeologists during the so-called Nubian Campaign, an international effort led by UNESCO prior to construction of the Nasser Dam. The excavations, carried out between 1961 and 1964, discovered a religious complex in the town of Faras (ancient Pachoras), near modern Sudanese-Egyptian border. Well-preserved ruins of a large Christian cathedral from 7th to 14th centuries contained well-preserved wall religious paintings.

Since the area was to be flooded by the waters of the artificial Lake Nasser, a team of Polish archaeologists led by Kazimierz Michałowski was allowed to recover the artifacts. A major part was then transported to the National Museum of Sudan, where a team of Polish scientists led by Józef Gazy carried out their conservation. Some 40 per cent were transported to the National Museum of Warsaw, becoming the nucleus of the future Faras Gallery.

The image itself was painted by an anonymous artist some time during bishop Petros' tenure, between 974 and 999 AD. It represents the so-called yellow and red style, typical of a transitional period between the white style of 9th century and later multicolour style introduced in the 11th century and typical of all later wall paintings at Faras until its abandonment in the 14th century. Other images representative of the yellow and red style found at Faras represent King Georgios, a Virgin and Child, Three Men in the Fiery Furnace, as well as a Passion Cycle. The red and yellow style paintings are considered among the most interesting, both visually and for their theological message.

== Description ==
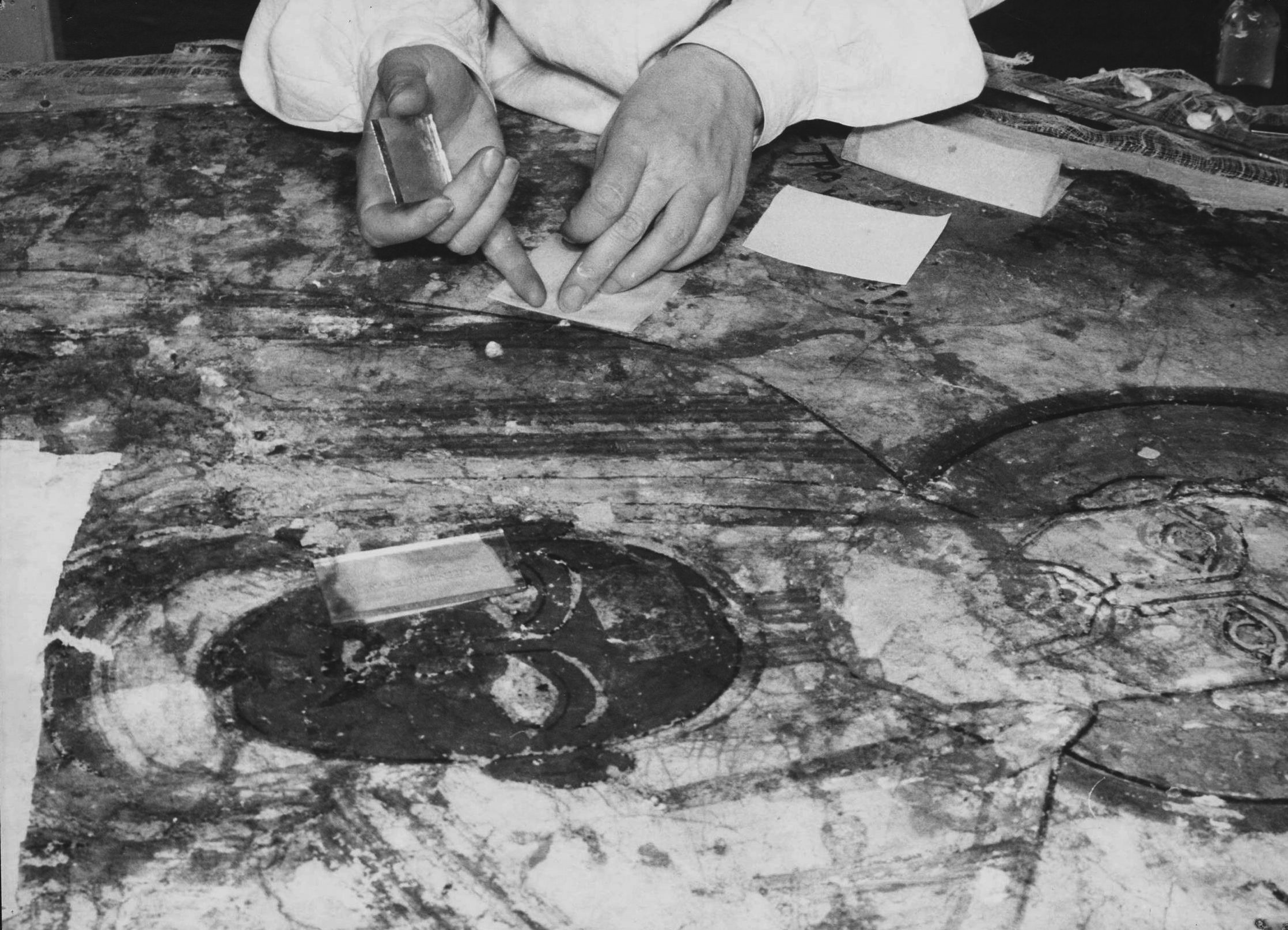
Work on conservation and restoration of the fresco in Warsaw's National Museum, 1964–1966

The dark-skinned bishop is depicted wearing his liturgical robes, complete with a narrow, white handkerchief (encheiron) wound around the index finger of his right palm. With it he points at a Gospel Book he holds in his other arm.

Petros is dressed in a long white robe (sticharion) with vertical green stripes. His yellow phelonion (a type of chasuble), in the shape of an elongated ellipse, is adorned with a pattern of a red net, with precious stones sewn into the fabric. The edge of the chasuble is also adorned with a strip of fabric with green and red jewels. Bishop's epitrachelion is decorated with yellow wheels with a green circuit and red rectangles. The omophorion, one of symbols of episcopal dignity, is white with a pattern of circles and rectangles. Petros was probably a miaphysite.

Behind the bishop stands Saint Peter the Apostle, dressed in a white crown signifying martyrdom. The saint has both hands on the shoulders of the bishop. This pose, common in Nubian painting of the epoch, signifies the fact that the saint protects and supports the bishop, but also points at the supernatural character of bishop's power.

Around the head of Saint Peter there is a black inscription in Greek: SAINT PETER THE APOSTLE MARTYR OF THE CROSS ABBA PETROS BISHOP AND METROPOLITAN OF PACHORAS [may he live] MANY YEARS.

== Sources ==
=== Bibliography ===
- Michałowski, Kazimierz (1974). Faras; die Wandbilder in den Sammlungen des Nationalmuseums zu Warschau (in German). Warszawa: Wydawn. Artystyczno-Graficzne. OCLC 1225416.
- Mierzejewska, Bożena (2016), "Malowidło ścienne – Biskup Petros pod opieką Św. Piotra", Muzeum Cyfrowe (in Polish)
- Mierzejewska, Bożena (2014), "Król Georgios II z Matką Boską z Dzieciątkiem & Biskup Petros ze świętym Piotrem Apostołem", in Mierzejewska, Bożena (ed.), Galeria Faras im. Profesora Kazimierza Michałowskiego. Przewodnik (in Polish), Warszawa: Muzeum Narodowe w Warszawie, pp. 180–182, ISBN 978-83-7100-916-7
- Gołgowski, Tadeusz (1967), "Z problematyki ikonografii biskupów Pachoras", Rocznik Muzeum Narodowego W Warszawie (in Polish) (11), Warszawa: Muzeum Narodowe w Warszawie
- Martens-Czarnecka, Małgorzata (2006), "Malowidła z Dongoli", in Martens-Czarnecka, Małgorzata; Jakobielski, Stefan (eds.), Polskie wykopaliska w Starej Dongoli: 45 lat współpracy archeologicznej z Sudanem (in Polish), Warszawa, p. 35
- Sulikowska, Aleksandra, ed. (2015). "Galeria Faras / Galerie stałe / Kolekcje / Muzeum Narodowe". www.mnw.art.pl (in Polish and English). Muzeum Narodowe w Warszawie (corporate author). Archived from the original on 2018-01-21.
