= Kazimierz Michałowski =

Polish archaeologist and Egyptologist

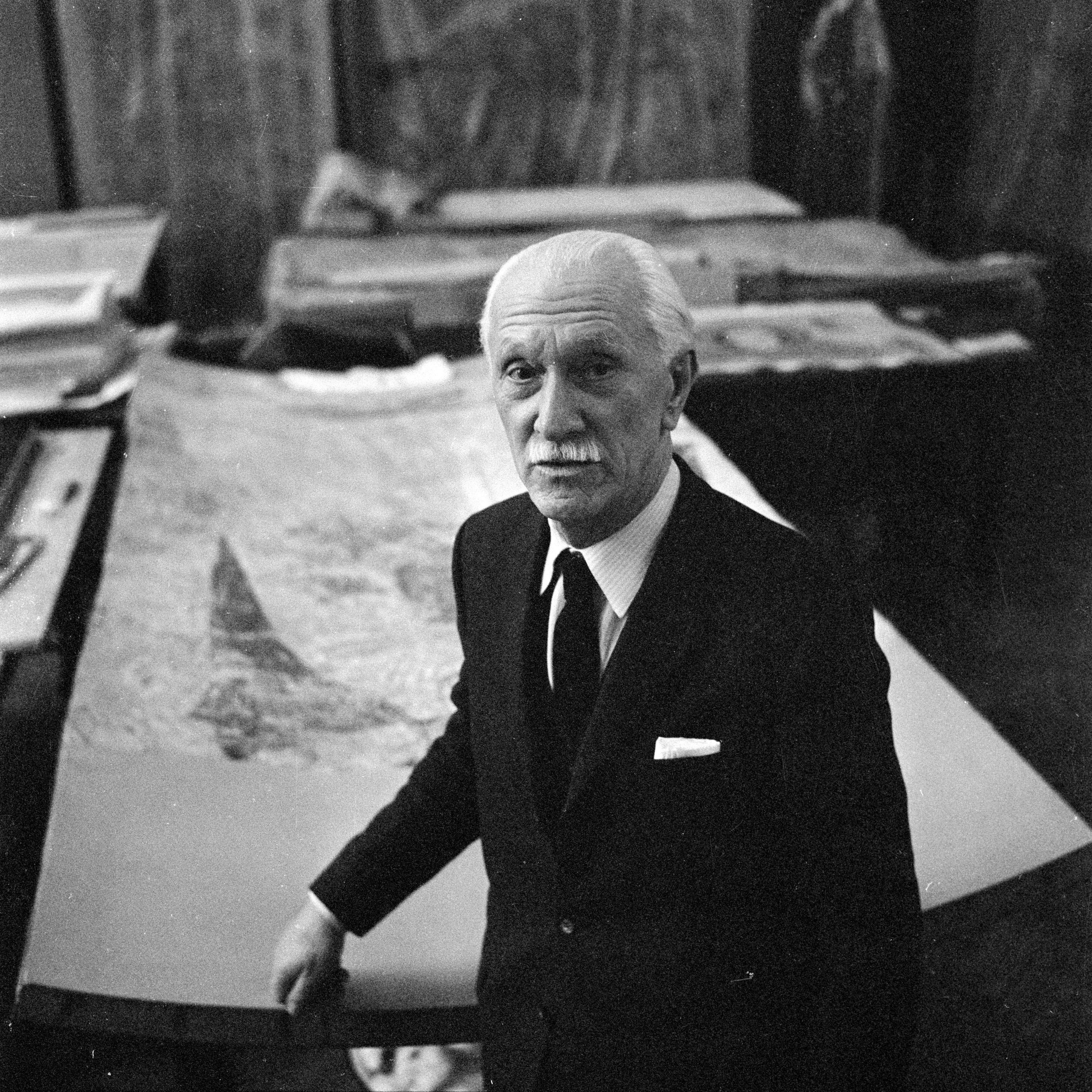
- Born: 14 December 1901; Tarnopol, Austria-Hungary
- Died: 1 January 1981 (aged 79); Warsaw, Polish People's Republic
- Education: University of Lviv
- Known for: founder of the Polish school of Mediterranean archaeology, precursor of Nubiology
- Scientific career
- Fields: Archaeology, art history

Kazimierz Józef Marian Michałowski (14 December 1901, in Tarnopol – 1 January 1981, in Warsaw) was a Polish archaeologist and Egyptologist, art historian, member of the Polish Academy of Sciences, professor ordinarius of the University of Warsaw as well as the founder of the Polish Centre of Mediterranean Archaeology. He coined the term "Nubiology" to refer to the study of ancient Nubia.

== Biography ==
=== Early life and the beginning of scientific career ===
Kazimierz Michałowski graduated from a gymnasium in Tarnopol and then studied classical archaeology and art history at the Philosophy Department of the Jan Kazimierz University in Lwów; he also attended philosophy lectures by Professor Kazimierz Twardowski. He broadened his knowledge at universities in Berlin, Heidelberg, Paris, Rome and Athens. As a young scientist he took part in excavations managed by École Française d`Athènes in Delphi, Thasos and Delos. In 1926 he defended his doctoral thesis devoted to Niobids in Greek art, which he prepared at the University of Lwów under the scientific supervision of Edmund Bulanda and which was published a year later in French. In 1931 he won his habilitation based on a dissertation about Hellenistic and Roman portraits from Delos, published next year in Paris. Immediately after habilitation he was delegated to the University of Warsaw, where in 1931 he established a Department of Classical Archaeology, in 1953 transformed into Mediterranean Archaeology Department, which he headed until his retirement in 1972.

In 1936 on his initiative Polish archaeologists from the University of Warsaw started archaeological works in Edfu in Egypt.

=== World War II ===
During the war he was imprisoned in the German prisoner-of-war camp Oflag II-C Woldenburg, where he was sent as a reserve officer and a soldier of the September campaign. In the camp, Michałowski organised educational activities for prisoners, conducted seminars and gave lectures on Egyptology and archaeology. In 1978 he reported that no one who had studied Egyptology in the prisoner of war camp had taken it up post-war as a discipline.

=== Activity after World War II ===
After World War II Michałowski took active part in the reconstruction of Polish culture and science. Since 1939 he had been a deputy director of the National Museum in Warsaw, initially responsible for organisation of the Gallery of Ancient Art opened to the public in 1949, and next for the Faras Gallery, which was opened in 1972. He organised numerous exhibitions displaying historical objects obtained during excavations he headed. In 1945-1947 he was a Dean of the Department of Humanities of the University of Warsaw and later a pro-rector of this same university (1947 – 1948). We was a visiting professor in Alexandria (1957-1958) and Aberdeen (1971). In 1956 he established the Research Centre for Mediterranean Archaeology of the Polish Academy of Sciences, which he headed. In 1960 he organised an opening of the Polish Centre of Mediterranean Archaeology of the University of Warsaw with quarters in Cairo, which he headed until his death. He regarded the opening of this facility as his greatest achievement.

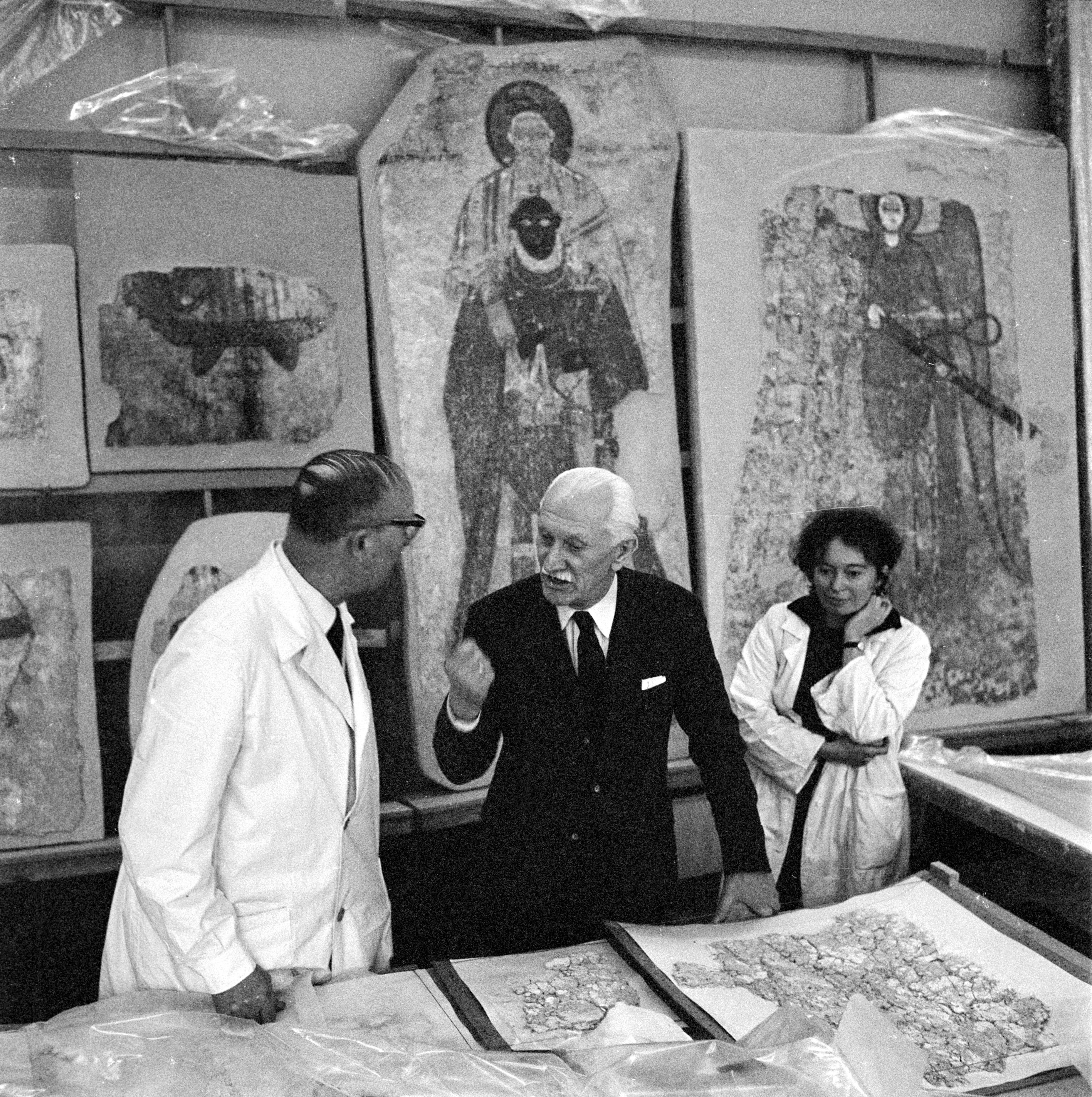
Professor Kazimierz Michałowski at work at the National Museum in Warsaw

He was a member of several national and foreign academies, scientific associations and institutes: Accademia Nazionale dei Lincei, British Academy, Deutsche Akademie der Wissenschaften zu Berlin, Heidelberg Academy of Sciences and Humanities, Sächsische Akademie der Wissenschaften zu Leipzig; Presidium of the Committee of Ancient Culture Sciences of the Polish Academy of Sciences, Committee of Oriental Studies of the Polish Academy of Sciences, Archaeological Institute of America, Deutsches Archäologisches Institut, Institut d'Egypte, Polish Archaeological Association (chairperson 1953 – 1957 and honorary member), Society for Nubian Studies (chairperson since 1972), Association Internationale des Égyptologues (deputy chairperson of the Honorary Committee since 1976), Association Internationale d'Epigraphie Latine (sdeputy chairperson), Warsaw Scientific Society (secretary general 1949–1952), Association Internationale d'Archéologie Classique, Société Archéologique Grecque, Association of Art Historians; member of École Française d'Athènes. He chaired Comité International des Experts pour le Sauvetage des Temples d'Abou Simbel UNESCO (1961-1970), Comité International pour les Musées d'Archéologie et d'Histoire ICOM (1965-1971) He was an expert of UNESCO pour les Musées et Fouilles Archéologiques d'Algérie (1966) as well as a member of Comité des Experts de l'UNESCO pour Mohendjo-Daro (1969). He was awarded an Honoris Causa Doctorate at the universities of Strasbourg (1965), Cambridge (1971), Uppsala (1977).

=== Popularising activity ===
Kazimierz Michałowski was an active promoter of Mediterranean archaeology. He translated and published W.H. Boulton's The Romance of Archaeology (1958) as well as publicising the results of excavation works in Edfu. He wrote for "Stolica", touching on subjects pertaining to ancient artefacts in the holdings of the National Museum in Warsaw. He gave numerous lectures and conducted seminars devoted to antiquity, whose social effect consisted of an impressive increase of interest in this discipline. 5000 students attended his public lecture on the art of ancient Egypt in the National Museum in Warsaw in 1957.

=== Personal life ===
The grandfather of Kazimierz Michałowski was Emil Michałowski, a representative to the Diet of the Kingdom of Galicia and Lodomeria and a director of the Teacher's University in Tarnopol as well as the mayor of this town. After World War II Michałowski married Krystyna Baniewicz, a daughter of Tadeusz Baniewicz, one of the founders of Podkowa Leśna. Krystyna Michałowska became engaged in her husband's activity – in later years the Baniewicz's villa in Podkowa Leśna was the seat of the Research Centre for Mediterranean Archeology Polish Academy of Science. Professor Michałowski's grave is located in a nearby cemetery in Brwinów.

== Excavations ==
Professor Michałowski conducted excavations in Egypt since the 1930s, and from 1959 on behalf of the Polish Centre of Mediterranean Archeology of the University of Warsaw, of which he was the founder and first director.

=== Edfu ===
According to Professor Michałowski "not only in the view of the scientific world but also in a broader opinion of a civilised society, the current cultural level of a given country is judged based on whether it has its own excavations in Egypt". On his initiative in 1936 archaeological works were started in Edfu and lasted till 1939. The expedition was accompanied by archaeologists from the University of Warsaw and the French Institute for Eastern Archaeology. These were the first excavations with participation of Polish archaeologists in the Mediterranean area. The works were performed on the pharaohs’ necropolis as well as in the ancient city of the Greek-Roman and Byzantian period. The number and artistic quality of historical monuments obtained during the first campaign (1936) enabled the organisation of an exhibition in the Gallery of Ancient Art in the National Museum in Warsaw, which was opened already in June 1937.

=== Myrmekion ===
Polish archaeologists’ participation in the excavations in Edfu turned the interest of the world of science to the Polish scholars and provided an opportunity for commencement of further excavations abroad. Michałowski started collaboration with Soviet archaeologists in Crimea. In July 1956 a group of Polish archaeologists started exploration works in Myrmekion, an ancient Greek colony, which continued till 1958. The works were not performed jointly as in the case of the Polish-French expedition in Edfu. The researchers worked in two separate teams, exploring two sections. The Polish group was headed by Professor Michałowski while the Soviet one – by Professor W.F. Gajdukiewicz from the Leningrad State University. A wine press with complete equipment from the Hellenistic period was discovered as well as fragments of residential buildings. All moveable historical objects discovered by the Polish expedition were transferred to Warsaw upon the consent of the Soviet archaeological office.

=== Tell Atrib ===
Professor Michałowski wanted to continue the works in Egypt after World War II. He was able to resume the exploration of Edfu but the French were banned from excavating in Egypt. Professor Michałowski decided that since the French archaeologists had not returned to Edfu without their Polish colleagues during World War II, he would also not go back there without them. Tell Atrib – Athribis, a capital city of the 10th nome of the Lower Egypt, today known as Benha – became a new excavation site. The works were performed from 1957 to 1969. The remains of an ancient water supply system of the Roman city were discovered, as well as remains of sacred buildings of the Late Period, foundations of Ahmose temple, a deposit, furnaces for limestone and Roman baths.

=== Palmyra ===
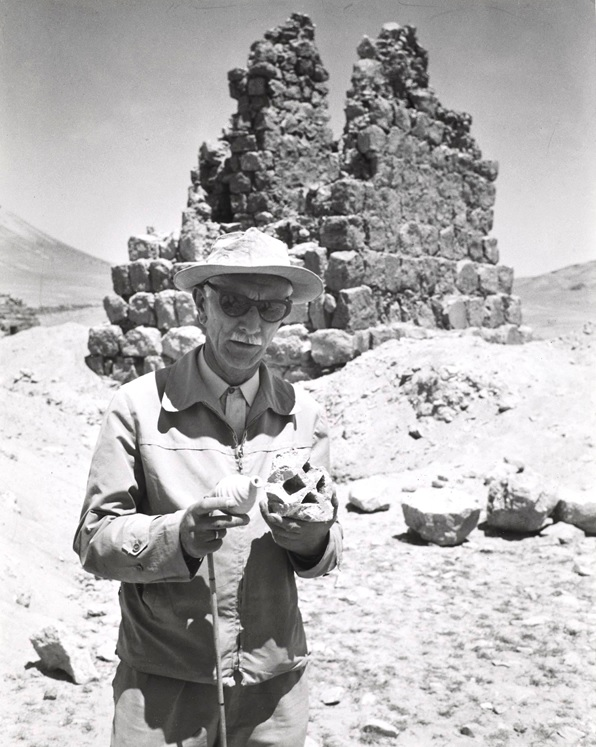
Kazimierz Michałowski on excavation site in Palmyra, 1962

On 4 May 1959 a group of Polish archaeologists headed by Professor Michałowski started excavation works in Palmyra. The works of Polish archaeologists focused on two sections. The first one was the so-called camp of Diocletian in the western part of the city, where the exploration covered the area between the Praetorian Gate and the Tetrapylon, on the square in front of the so-called Temple of the Standards and inside the temple itself. The city walls were also investigated and a fragment of the Praetorian Road was excavated. On the second section, in the so-called Valley of Tombs, i.e. Palmyrene necropolis, tombs of Zabda, Alaine and Julius Aurelius Hermes were discovered. The excavations enabled determination of the urban development of the city as well as the dating of the revealed buildings based on the epigraphic material they contained. A discovery of a treasure consisting of jewelry and 27 golden solidus coins dating back to the times of Phocas, Heraclius and Constans was a sensational success. So great was the value and significance of the discovered material that since 1966 an annual paper titled "Studia Palmyreńskie" has been published in Warsaw and is still published today. Polish archaeologists became experts in the exploration of ancient Palmyra.

=== Alexandria ===
Excavations on Kom el-Dikka in Alexandria began in 1960. Polish archaeologists comprised the first foreign mission which managed to obtain a permit for exploration of Alexandria. Groups of Italian, English and German scientists worked for the Greek-Roman Museum in Alexandria or they represented it. It is difficult to work on this area since in the 1740s Muhammad Ali mandated that a city be constructed here. The relics of the past remain hidden under a modern development. Monumental Roman baths with numerous swimming pools and cisterns as well as a Roman villa were discovered there. Polish archaeologists revealed also the first theatre to have been discovered in Egypt. This discovery was so sensational that Professor Michałowski received additional funds from the municipal authorities, enabling continuation of works. The ancient theatre was fully revealed and reconstructed. Today it is one of the greatest attractions in Alexandria and is used to stage performances. This is how an ancient building was successfully preserved in a contemporary development. Polish archaeologists explored also two Arabic necropolises on the area of Kom el-Dikka.

=== Deir el-Bahari ===
The works were started in 1961 on the request of the Egyptian minister of culture who was determined to reconstruct the temple of Queen Hatshepsut. In 1968 engineers from the State Studios for Conservation of Cultural Property joined archaeologists to perform construction-restoration works in this temple. When working on this commission Professor Michałowski discovered a previously unknown funerary temple of Thutmose III (already during the first campaign). In consequence most of exploration works were moved to this site. The temple was unique due to its location and layout which differed from other sacral buildings of the New Kingdom period. The works are continued to this day.

=== Faras ===
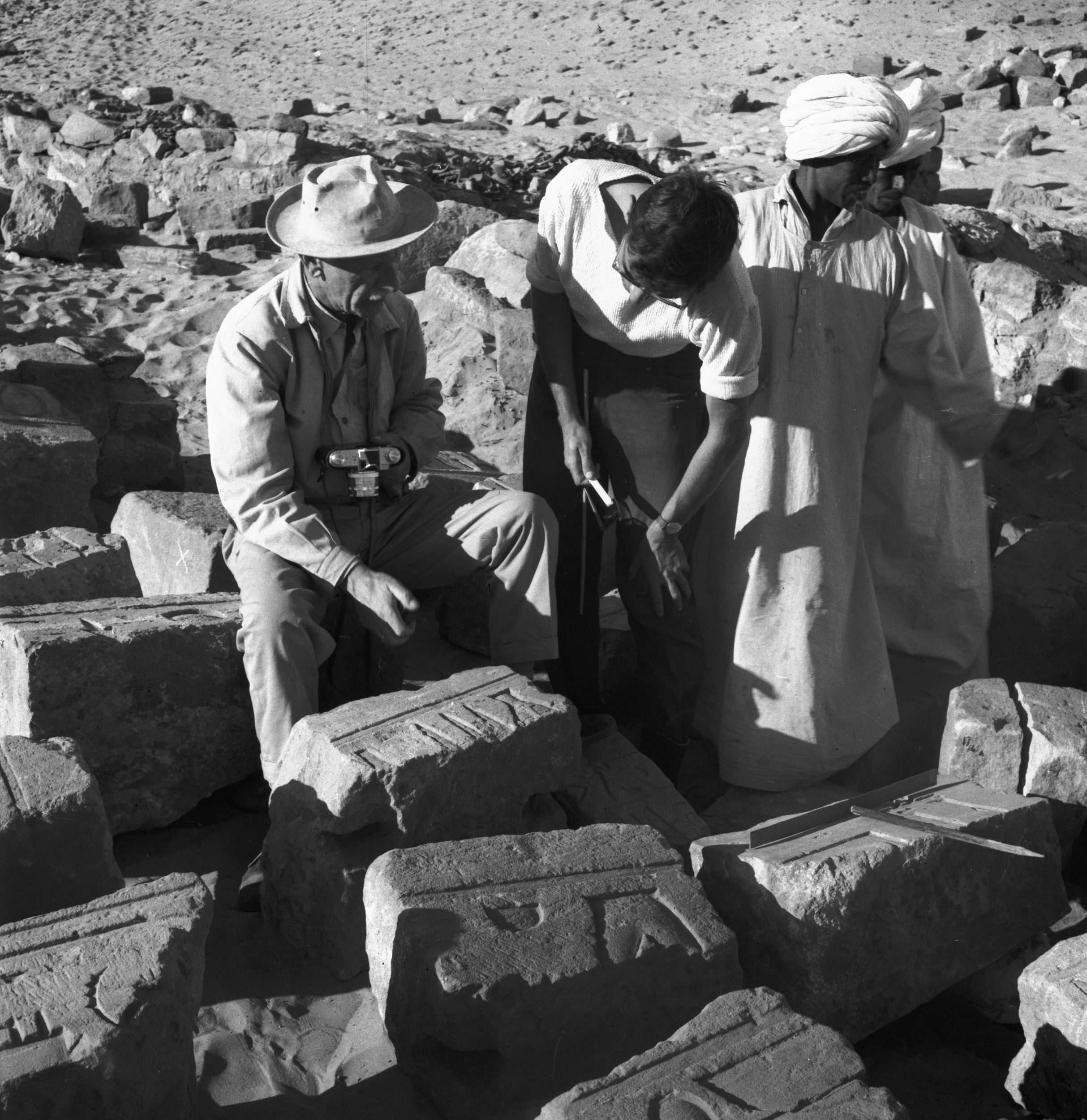
Kazimierz Michałowski during the excavations at Faras

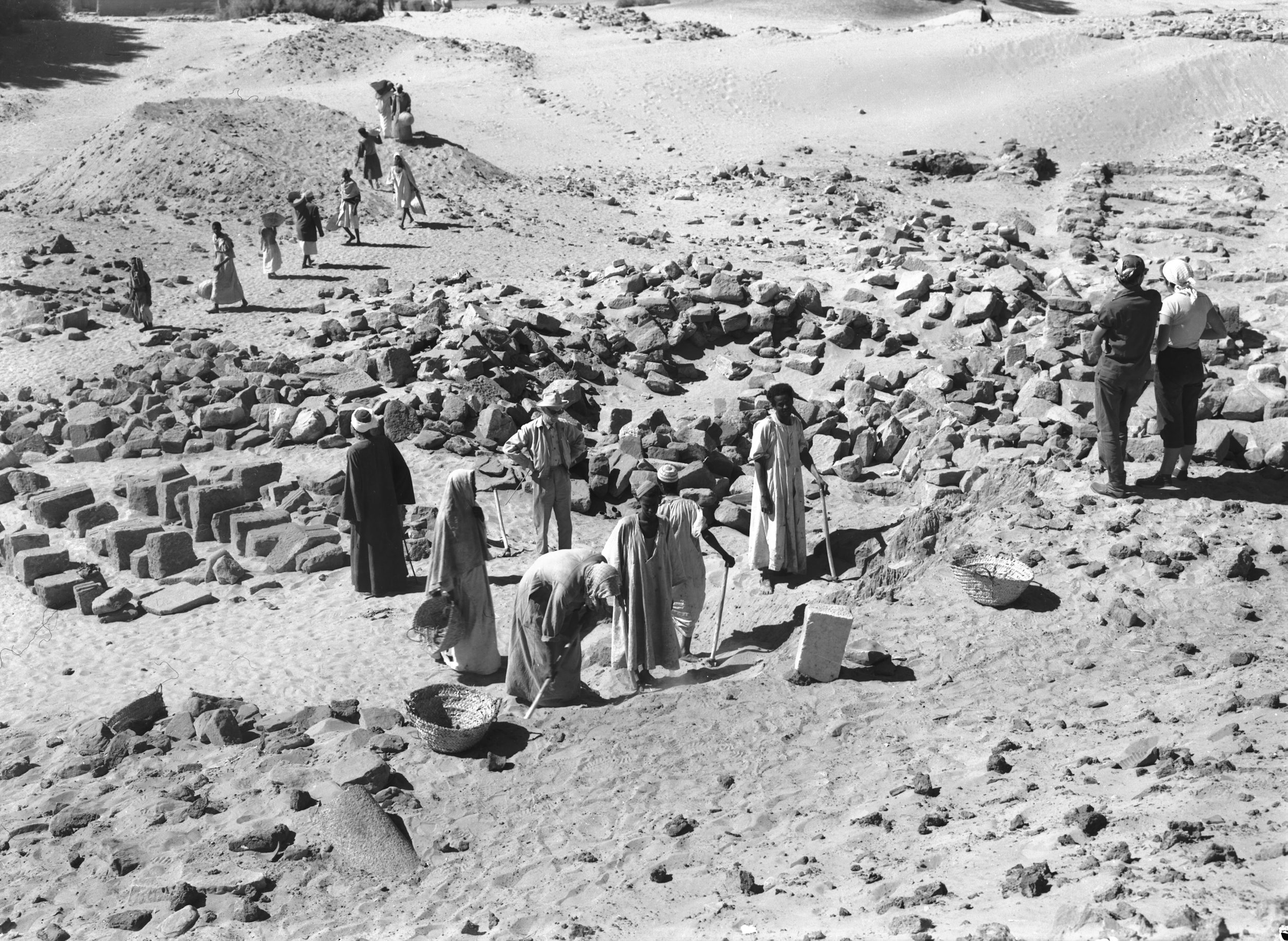
Excavations at Faras

Faras, ancient Pachoras, was a capital city of the Northern Nubian kingdom. In 1961–1964 rescue excavations were performed there, headed by Professor Michałowski. The exploration was part of a larger project, named the Nubian Campaign, managed under the auspices of UNESCO, whose objective was to salvage historical artefacts from flooding by the Nile in connection to the Aswan High Dam development. Ruins of a medieval cathedral church of the bishops of Pachoras were discovered along with religious paintings dating back to the 7th – 13th century. A set of the so-called "frescos from Faras" (actually they are not frescos but paintings executed with tempera paint on dry plaster) comprising more than 150 paintings became one of the greatest and most interesting discoveries of the Nubian Campaign. 67 paintings and fragments of stone decoration from the cathedral as well as other churches and buildings in Faras, epitaphs of local bishops and chaplains and local, artisanal products including pottery are stored in the Faras Gallery in Honour of Professor Kazimierz Michałowski in the National Museum in Warsaw. Remaining historical objects discovered in Faras are contained within the holdings of the National Museum of Sudan in Khartoum.

=== Dongola ===
Professor Michałowski started excavations in Old Dongola in 1964. Since 1966 the works were headed by Stefan Jakobielski. Kings of the joined Nubian kingdoms resided in the Dongola from the 8th to the early 13th century. A central nave of the church with columns preserved in situ was discovered already in the first weeks of the works. Scientific writing refers to this discovery as the "church of the columns". Grave inscriptions found in the church suggested it dated back to the 2nd half of the 8th century. Column capitals revealed in the sacral buildings are stylistically similar to those discovered in the Faras cathedral. Additionally, older foundations of a sacral building were discovered under the "church of the columns". The second building based on the cruciform plan was also explored as well as a mosque which turned out to be erected on a former royal palace and not (as previously assumed) on a Christian temple. Polish archaeologists discovered also a baptistery. Since 1966 a Polish expedition was performing parallel prehistoric excavations in the vicinity the village of Gaddar.

=== Abu Simbel ===
Professor Michałowski did not excavate in Abu Simbel but along with a team of Polish archaeologists he took part in the salvaging of rock temples of Pharaoh Ramesses II, which were at risk of being flooded with the waters of Lake Nasser. The project involved also archaeologists from other countries such as Italy and France. One of the ideas for salvaging the temples was to move them to a place of safety. Another idea was the leave them in place. UNESCO established a special commission to deal with this issue. The commission consisted of the Director-General of UNESCO, the chairperson of the advisory board and three expert – archaeologists. Professor Michałowski was one of them. They supported a Swedish-Egyptian idea consisting in cutting the temples into large, 30-tonne blocks in order to reconstruct them in a new location. Professor Michałowski was appointed a chairperson of the 7-people international expert committee supervising the relocation of Pharaoh Ramesses II's temples. The works lasted 10 years and were crowned with success.

=== Nea Paphos ===
In June 1965 a Polish archaeological expedition headed by Professor Michałowski started excavation works in Nea Paphos in Cyprus. New Paphos was founded at the end of the 4th century BC as a port intended for Greek pilgrims arriving to pay tribute to Aphrodite. Already the first days of works in the south-west part of Paphos led to a discovery of marble sculptures of Asclepius and Artemis worshipped in the city. Coins presenting Alexander the Great were discovered, which confirmed the city foundation date. City development of the Hellinistic period was revealed with well-preserved paintings in the so-called first Pompeian style as well as a proconsul's palace with private baths. A mosaic presenting Theseus wrestling Minotaur in a labyrinth was discovered in this building. Ariadne and a woman symbolising Crete are watching the fight. This mosaic is regarded as the most beautiful decoration of this type in the Mediterranean area. Polish excavations proved that Nea Paphos was a political centre of the island. The works initiated by Professor Michałowski are continued by the Polish Centre of Mediterranean Archaeology University of Warsaw in honour of Professor Kazimierz Michałowski.

== Distinctions, rewards and recognition ==
In 1947 Michałowski was awarded the Commander's Cross and the Order of Polonia Restituta for his "merits and contribution into the protection of the Polish cultural masterpieces". On 21 July 1977 he received the 1st Class Order of the Builders of People's Poland. He was also a winner of the 1st and 2nd Degree State Award. In addition he also received the following distinctions: 1st Class Order of the Banner of Work, 5th Class Virtuti Military Cross (for the 1939 campaign), Gold Cross of Merit. He was also awarded in Egypt and Syria as well as in France (Officer's Cross and Commander's Cross of the National Order of the Legion of Honour), Italy (Commander's Cross of the Order of the Crown of Italy), Greece (Commander's Cross of the Order of the Phoenix), Belgium (Grand Officer's Cross of the Order of Leopold).

His name was given to the Polish Centre of Mediterranean Archaeology of the University of Warsaw and the Faras Gallery in the National Museum in Warsaw. In 2001 Polish Post issued 200 thousand copies of a postcard dedicated to the 100th anniversary of Professor Michałowski's birthday. The postcard presented a nave of the Faras Cathedral and the portrait of Professor Michałowski himself. The bust of Professor Michałowski is exhibited in the gardens of the Museum of Egyptian Antiquities in Cairo and numerous souvenirs related to Professor are stored in the holdings of the Museum of Warsaw University. The Professor's name was also given to streets in Częstochowa, Malbork and Słupsk.

In 2015 Public Middle School in Podkowa Leśna was named after Professor Michałowski.

== Selected publications ==
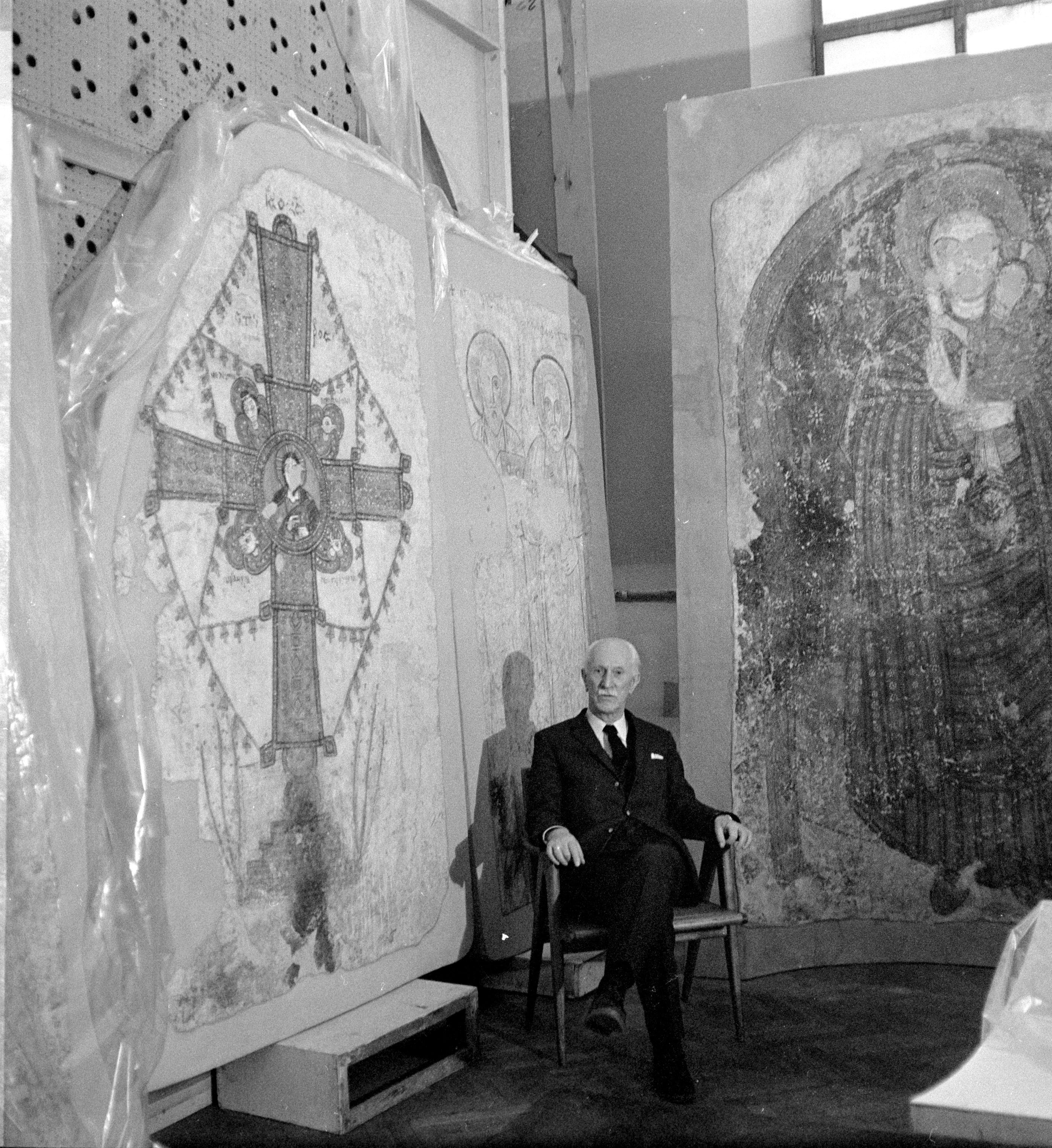
Kazimierz Michałowski in front of wall paintings from Faras, 1960s

=== Books ===
- Fouilles franco-polonaises. Tell Edfou (1938)
- Sztuka starożytna (1955)
- Kanon w architekturze egipskiej (1955)
- Fouilles polonaises, kilka tomów (od 1960)
- Nie tylko piramidy. Sztuka dawnego Egiptu (1966)
- Faras. Centre artistique de la Nubie chretienne (1966)
- Art of Ancient Egypt (1969)
- Arte y civilizacion de Egipto (1969)
- Karnak (1969)
- Luksor (1971)
- Aleksandria (1972)
- Piramidy i mastaby (1972)
- Teby (1974) (wspólne z A.Dziewanowskim)
- Od Edfu do Faras. Polskie odkrycia archeologii śródziemnomorskiej (1974)
- Egypte (1978)
- Delfy (1979)
- Wybór prac Opera Minora (1990)

=== Articles ===
- "Les Niobides dans l'art plastique grec de la seconde moitié du Vème siecle", Eos, vol. XXX 1927, pp. 175–193.
- "Ein Niobekopf aus den Sammlungen des Fürsten Radziwiłł in Nieborów", AA 1927, pp. 58–70.
- "Zum Sarkophag aus S. Constanza", RM, XLIII, 1928, pp. 132–146.
- "Virgile et les beaux arts", Eos, XXXIII, 1930, pp. 43–58.
- "Un portrait égyptien d'Auguste au Musée du Caire", Bull. de l'Inst.Français au Caire 1935, pp. 73–88.
- "La fin de l'art grec", BCH, 1946, pp. 385–392.
- "Les expositions itinérantes dans les musées de Pologne", Museum, vol. III no. 4, 1950, pp. 275–282.
- "Rapport sur la prospection du terrain dans la région de la mosquée de Nabi Daniel en 1958", Bull. de la Fac. de Droit – Université d'Alexandrie, vol. XIII, 1958, pp. 37–43.
- "Kalos Limen", EAA IV, Roma 1961, pp. 304–305.
- "Les fouilles archéologiques et l'art antique au Musée National de Varsovie", Bull. Mus. Nat. de Varsovie, III 1962, pp. 62–63.
- "Peintures chrétiennes du VIIe s. à Faras", ibid., pp. 3–8.
- "Palmira", EAA vol. V, Roma 1963, pp. 900–908.
- "La Nubie chrétienne", Africana Bulletin 3, 1965, pp. 9–26.
- "Archéologie méditerranéenne en Pologne aprés la seconde guerre mondiale", Études et Travaux, vol. I, 1966, pp. 5–22.
- "Algérie — la modernisation des musées en Algérie", Le Courrier de l'Unesco, Mai 1966, pp. 1–45, annexe, pp. 34–45.
- "Les deux Asclepios de Nea Paphos", RA, 1968 no. 2, pp. 355–358.
- "Polish Excavations in Old Dongola 1964", Kush, vol. XIV 1969, pp. 289–299.
- "Open Problems of Nubian Art and Culture in the Light of the Discoveries at Faras", in Kunst und Geschichte Nubiens in christlicher Zeit, Recklinghausen 1970, pp. 11–20.
- "Classification générale des peintures murales de Faras", in Mélanges Devambez (RA 1972 z.2) pp. 375–380.
- "Tell Atrib", EAA VIII Supplemento, Roma 1973, pp. 799–800.
- "Ancient Egyptian Visual Arts", Encyclopædia Britannica, vol. XV (1974), pp. 248–258.
- "Nouvelles recherches sur la topographie de Palmyre", in Mélanges d'histoire ancienne et d'archéologie offerts à Paul Collart (Cahiers d'Archéologie Romande 5), 1975, pp. 305–306.
- "Les fouilles archéologiques polonaises en Afrique", Africana Bulletin, vol. 25, 1976 (1978), pp. 13–26.
- "Études sur les tendances actuelles dans la pratique de fouilles archéologiques. Suggestions et idées générales pour l'établissement des 'musées-sites'", Rocznik MNW, vol. XXIV 1980, pp. 345–355.

== See also ==
- List of Egyptologists
- List of Poles
- Nubiology
- Polish Centre of Mediterranean Archaeology University of Warsaw
