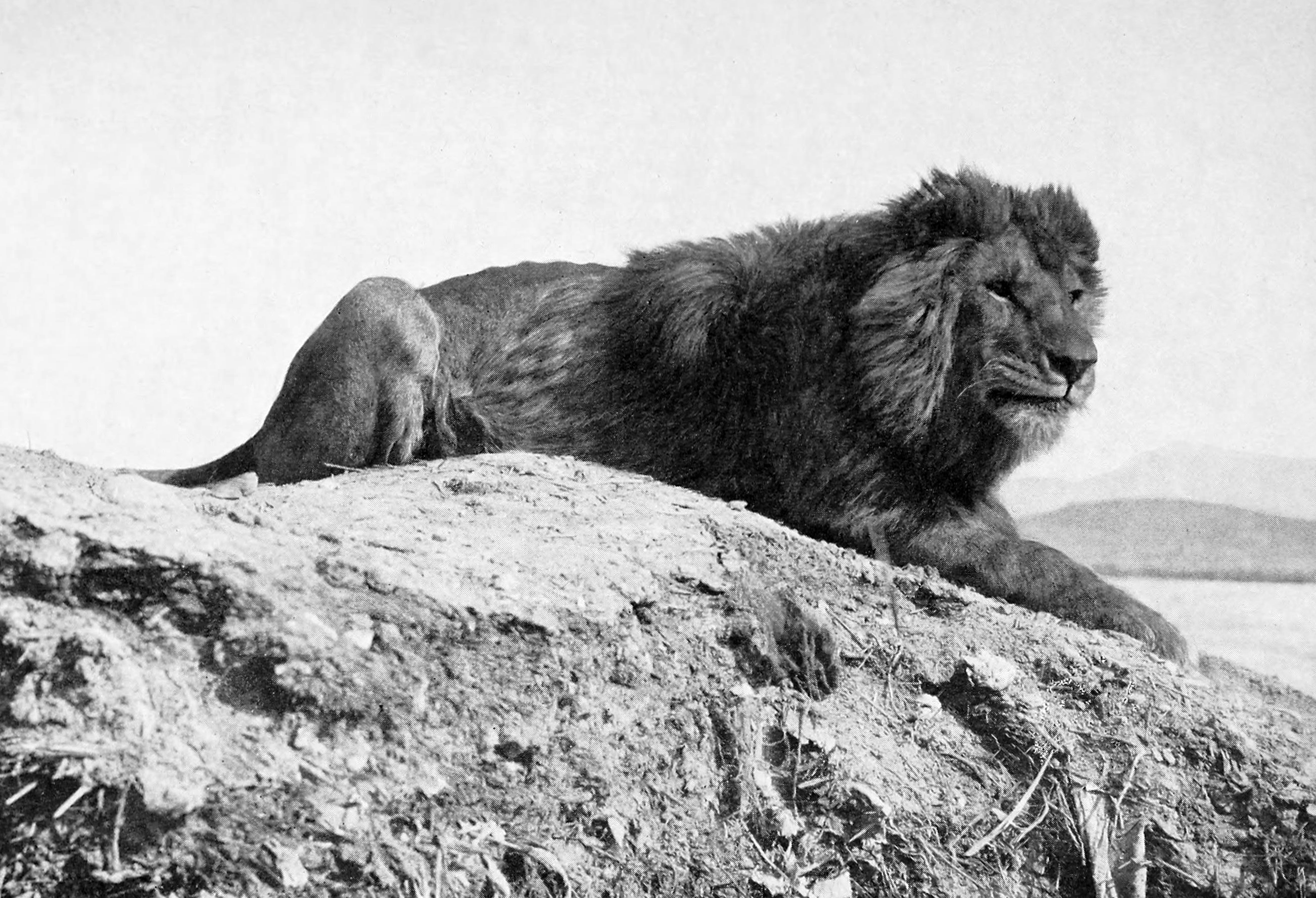
- Barbary lion in Algeria, 1893

Scientific classification
- Kingdom: Animalia
- Phylum: Chordata
- Class: Mammalia
- Order: Carnivora
- Family: Felidae
- Genus: Panthera
- Species: P. leo
- Subspecies: P. l. leo
- Population: †Barbary lion

= Barbary lion =

Lion population

The Barbary lion was a population of the lion subspecies Panthera leo leo. It was also called North African lion, Atlas lion, and Egyptian lion. It inhabited the mountains and deserts of the Maghreb in North Africa, from Morocco to Egypt. A comprehensive review of hunting and sighting records revealed that small groups of lions may have survived in Algeria until the early 1960s, and in Morocco until the mid-1960s. Today, the wild population is extinct in this region. It was eradicated following the spread of firearms and bounties for shooting lions.

Fossils of the Barbary lion dating back between 100,000 and 110,000 years were discovered in the Bizmoune cave near Essaouira. Until 2017, the Barbary lion was considered a distinct lion subspecies. Results of morphological and genetic analyses of lion samples from North Africa showed that the Barbary lion does not differ significantly from the Asiatic lion and falls into the same subclade. This North African-Asian subclade is closely related to lions from West Africa and northern parts of Central Africa and is therefore grouped into the northern lion subspecies Panthera leo leo.

== Characteristics ==
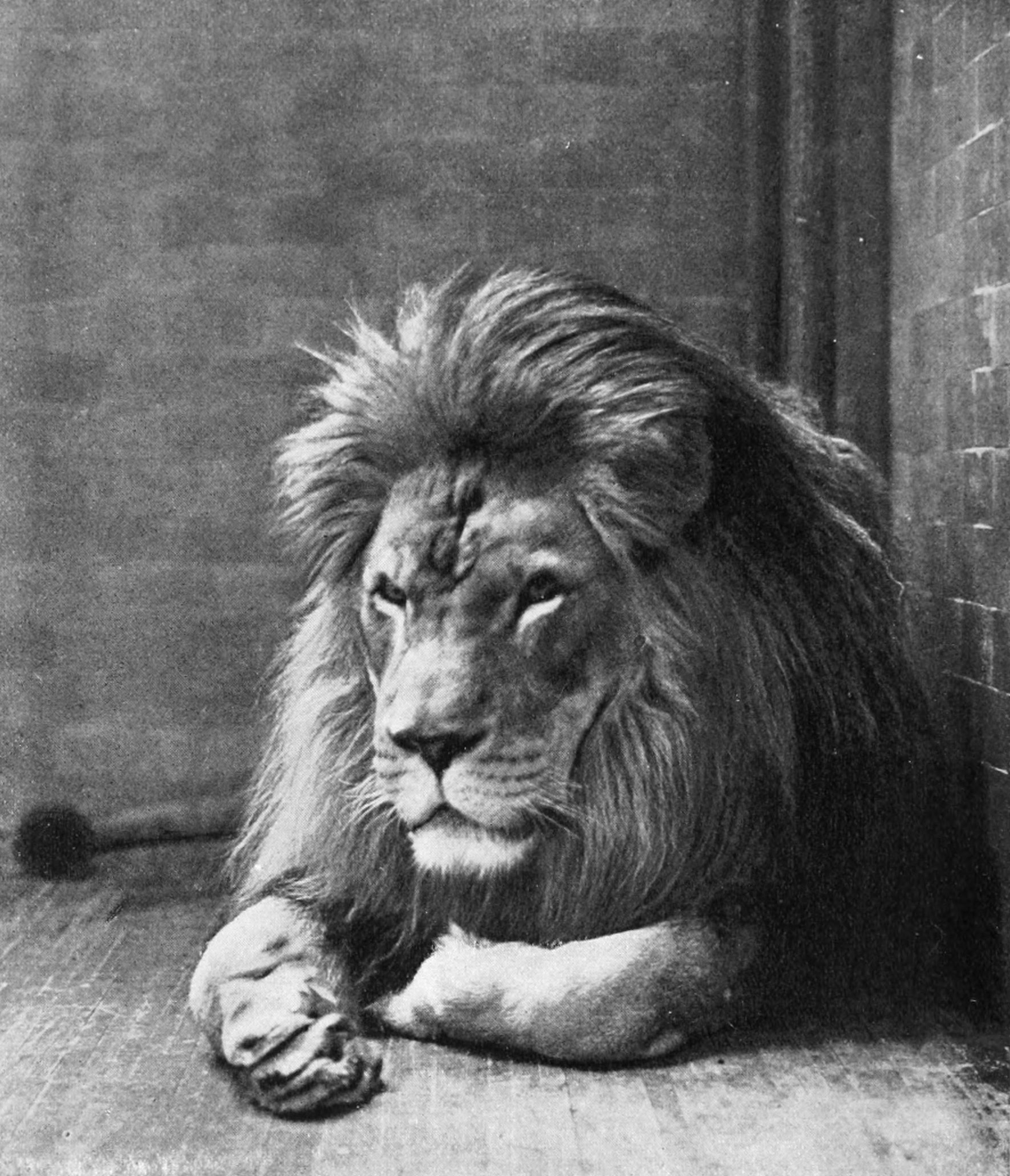
A Barbary lion in the Bronx Zoo (1897)

Barbary lion zoological specimens range in colour from light to dark tawny. Male lion skins had manes of varying colouration and length. Head-to-tail length of stuffed males in zoological collections varies from 2.35 to 2.8 m (7.7 to 9.2 ft), and of females around 2.5 m (8.2 ft). Skull size varied from 30.85 to 37.23 cm (12.15 to 14.66 in). Some manes extended over the shoulder and under the belly to the elbows. The mane hair was 8 to 22 cm (3.1 to 8.7 in) long.

In 19th-century hunter accounts, the Barbary lion was claimed to be the largest lion, with a weight of wild males ranging from 270 to 300 kg (600 to 660 lb). Yet, the accuracy of such data measured in the field is questionable. Captive Barbary lions were much smaller but kept under such poor conditions that they might not have attained their full potential size and weight.

The colour and size of lions' manes was long thought to be a sufficiently distinct morphological characteristic to accord a subspecific status to lion populations. Mane development varies with age and between individuals from different regions, and is therefore not a sufficient characteristic for subspecific identification. The size of manes is not regarded as evidence for Barbary lions' ancestry. Instead, results of mitochondrial DNA research support the genetic distinctness of Barbary lions in a unique haplotype found in museum specimens that is thought to be of Barbary lion descent. The presence of this haplotype is considered a reliable molecular marker to identify captive Barbary lions.

Barbary lions may have developed long-haired manes, because of lower temperatures in the Atlas Mountains than in other African regions, particularly in winter. Results of a long-term study on lions in Serengeti National Park indicate that ambient temperature, nutrition and the level of testosterone influence the colour and size of lion manes.

== Taxonomy ==
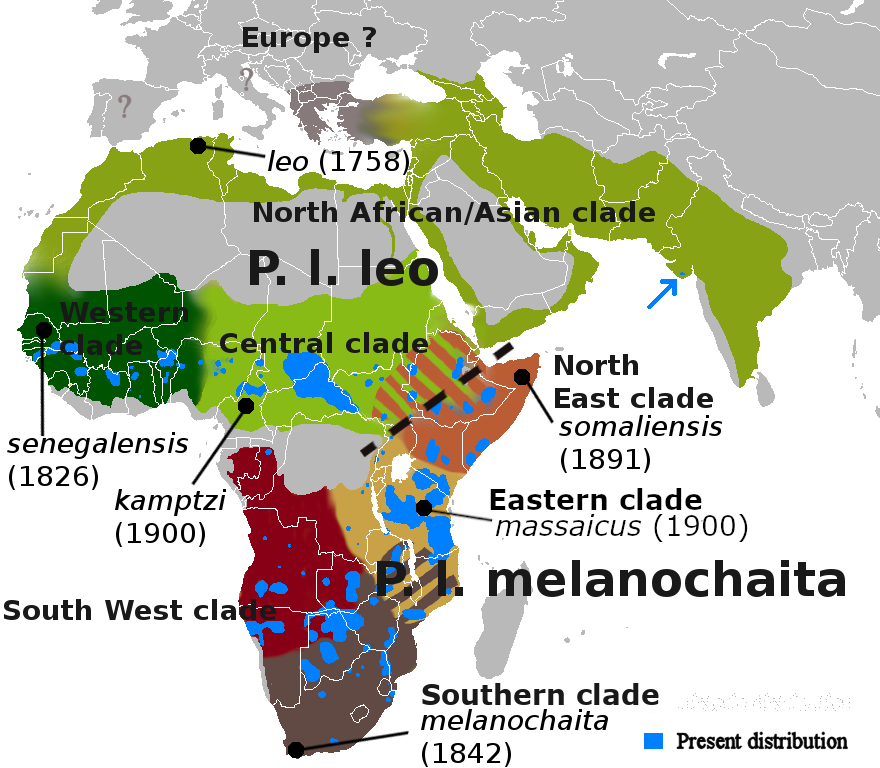
Map shows range of P. l. leo and P. l. melanochaita

Felis leo was the scientific name proposed by Carl Linnaeus in 1758 for a type specimen from Constantine, Algeria. Following Linnaeus's description, several lion zoological specimens from North Africa were described and proposed as subspecies in the 19th century:

- Felis leo barbaricus, described by the Austrian zoologist Johann Nepomuk Meyer in 1826, was a lion skin from the Barbary Coast.
- Felis leo nubicus, described by Henri Marie Ducrotay de Blainville in 1843, was a male lion from Nubia that had been sent by Antoine Clot from Cairo to Paris, and died in the Ménagerie du Jardin des Plantes in 1841.

In 1930, Reginald Innes Pocock subordinated the lion to the genus Panthera, when he wrote about the Asiatic lion.

In the 20th and early 21st centuries, there has been much debate and controversy among zoologists on lion classification and validity of proposed subspecies:

- In 1939, Glover Morrill Allen considered F. l. barbaricus and nubicus synonymous with F. l. leo.
- In 1951, John Ellerman and Terence Morrison-Scott recognized only two lion subspecies in the Palearctic realm, namely the African lion Panthera leo leo and the Asiatic lion P. l. persica.
- Some authors considered P. l. nubicus a valid subspecies and synonymous with P. l. massaica.
- In 2005, P. l. barbarica, nubica and somaliensis were subsumed under P. l. leo.
- In 2016, IUCN Red List assessors used P. l. leo for all lion populations in Africa.

The Barbary lion was considered a distinct lion subspecies. In 2017, the Cat Classification Task Force of the IUCN-Cat Specialist Group subsumed the lion populations in North, West and Central Africa and Asia to P. l. leo.

The Barbary lion was also called North African lion, Atlas lion, and Egyptian lion.

=== Genetic research ===
Results of a phylogeographic analysis using samples from African and Asiatic lions was published in 2006. One of the African samples was a vertebra from the National Museum of Natural History (France) that originated in the Nubian part of Sudan. In terms of mitochondrial DNA, it grouped with lion skull samples from the Central African Republic, Ethiopia and the northern part of the Democratic Republic of the Congo.

While the historical Barbary lion was morphologically distinct, its genetic uniqueness remained questionable. In a comprehensive study about the evolution of lions in 2008, 357 samples of wild and captive lions from Africa and India were examined. Results showed that four captive lions from Morocco did not exhibit any unique genetic characteristics, but shared mitochondrial haplotypes with lion samples from West and Central Africa. They were all part of a major mtDNA grouping that also included Asiatic lion samples. Results provided evidence for the hypothesis that this group developed in East Africa, and about 118,000 years ago travelled north and west in the first wave of lion expansion. It had split within Africa, and later in West Asia. Lions in Africa probably constitute a single population that interbred during several waves of migration since the Late Pleistocene. Genome-wide data of a wild-born historical lion specimen from Sudan clustered with P. l. leo in mtDNA-based phylogenies, but with a high affinity to P. l. melanochaita.

A comprehensive genetic study published in 2016 confirmed the close relationship between the extinct Barbary lions from Northern Africa and lions from Central and West Africa and in addition showed that the former fall into the same subclade as the Asiatic lion.

== Former distribution and habitat ==
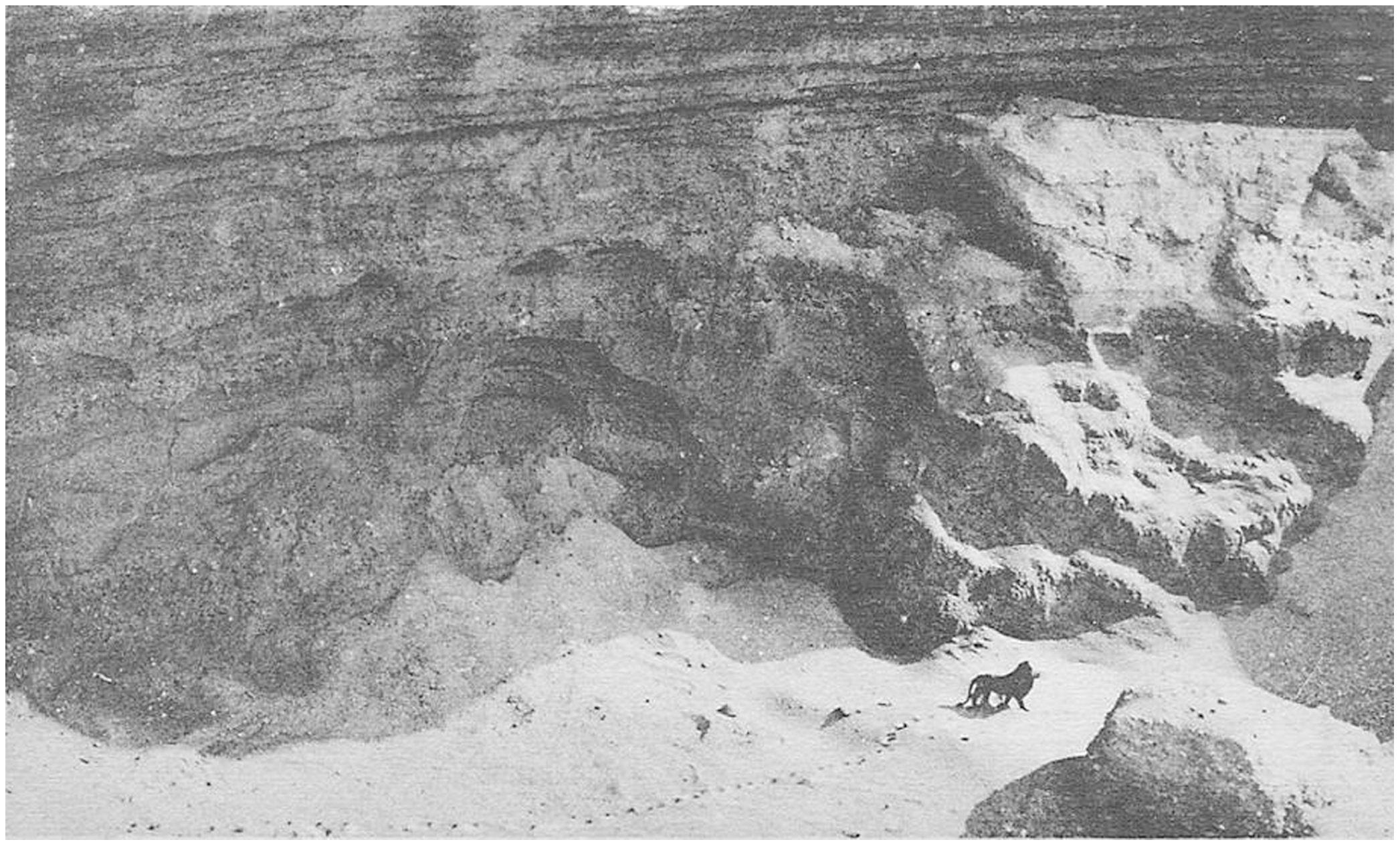
The last photograph of a wild lion in the Moroccan Atlas Mountains, taken by Marcelin Flandrin in 1925

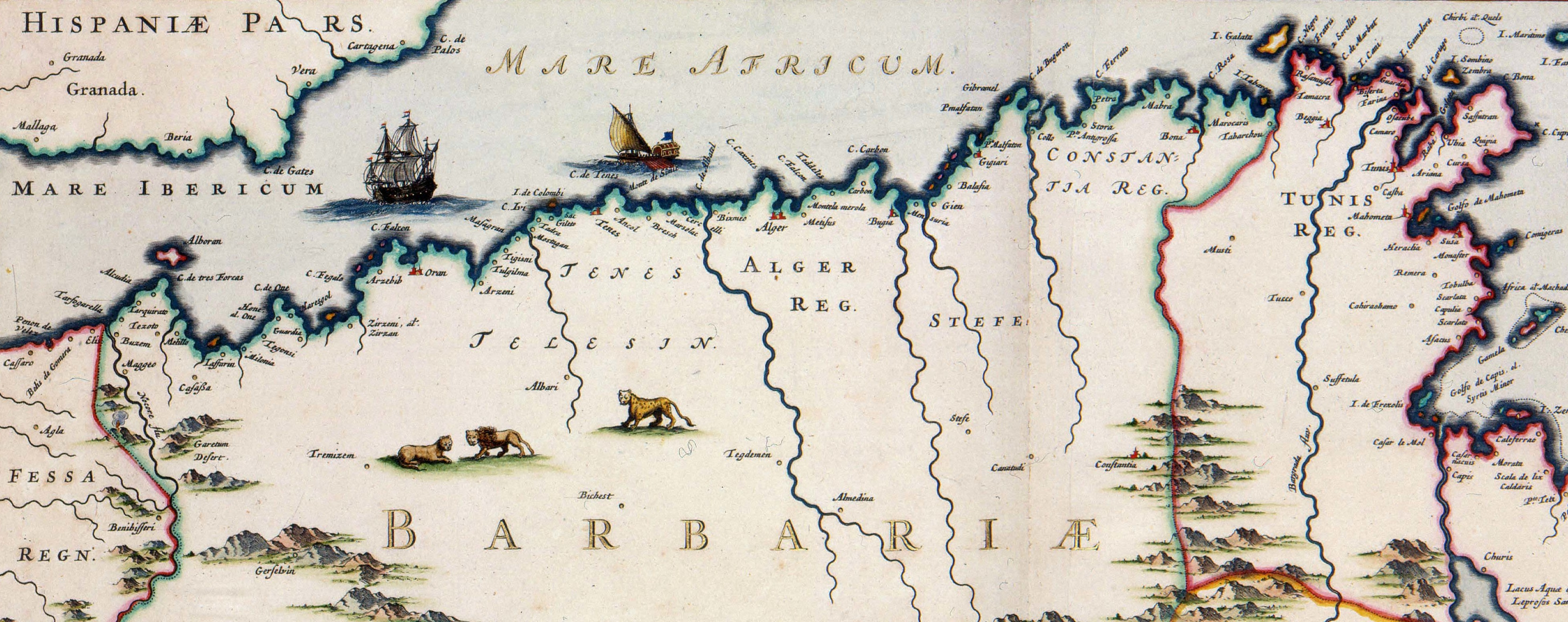
This detail of a map by Jan Janssonius (1588-1664) shows the former "Barbary Coast" of North Africa, known in the 17th century as Barbaria, now part of Algeria

Fossils of the Barbary lion dating to between 100,000 and 110,000 years were found in the Bizmoune cave near Essaouira. The Barbary lion lived in the mountains and deserts of the Maghreb in North Africa from Morocco to Egypt. Today, it is locally extinct in this region. The Barbary lion reportedly inhabited Mediterranean forests, woodlands, and scrub from the Anti-Atlas, the Atlas Mountains and the Rif in Morocco, the Ksour and Amour Ranges in Algeria to the Aurès Mountains in Tunisia. It was eradicated following the spread of firearms and bounties for shooting lions.

Historical accounts indicate that in Egypt, lions occurred in the Sinai Peninsula, along the Nile, in the Eastern and Western Deserts, in the region of Wadi El Natrun and along the maritime coast of the Mediterranean. In the 14th century BC, Thutmose IV hunted lions in the hills near Memphis. The growth of civilisations along the Nile and in the Sinai Peninsula by the beginning of the second millennium BC and desertification contributed to isolating lion populations in North Africa.

In the 1830s, lions may have already been eliminated along the coast of the Mediterranean Sea and near human settlements. In Libya, the Barbary lion persisted along the coast until the beginning of the 18th century, and was extirpated in Tunisia by 1890. By the mid-19th century, the Barbary lion population had massively declined, since bounties were paid for shooting lions. The cedar forests of Chelia and neighbouring mountains in Algeria harboured lions until about 1884; it inhabited the forests and wooded hills of the Constantine Province southward into the Aurès Mountains and was sighted in the hilghlands between Ouarsenis in the west to the Chelif River plains in the north, and the Pic de Taza in the east. The Barbary lion disappeared in the Bône region by 1890, in the Khroumire and Souk Ahras regions by 1891, and in Batna Province by 1893. The last recorded shooting of a Barbary lion took place in 1942 near Tizi n'Tichka in the Moroccan part of the Atlas Mountains, and the last known sighting of a lion in Algeria occurred in 1956 in Beni Ourtilane District; a small relict population may have survived in remote mountain areas in Algeria into the early 1960s and in Morocco until the mid-1960s.

== Behaviour and ecology ==
In the early 20th century, when Barbary lions were rare, they were sighted in pairs or in small family groups comprising a male and female lion with one or two cubs. Between 1839 and 1942, sightings of wild lions involved solitary animals, pairs and family units. Analysis of these sightings indicate that lions retained living in prides even when under increasing persecution, particularly in the eastern Maghreb. The size of prides was likely similar to prides living in sub-Saharan habitats, whereas the density of the Barbary lion population is considered to have been lower than in moister habitats.

When Barbary stag (Cervus elaphus barbarus) and gazelles became scarce in the Atlas Mountains, lions preyed on herds of livestock that were carefully tended. They also preyed on wild boar (Sus scrofa).

Sympatric predators in this region included the African leopard (P. pardus pardus) and Atlas bear (Ursus arctos crowtheri).

== In captivity ==
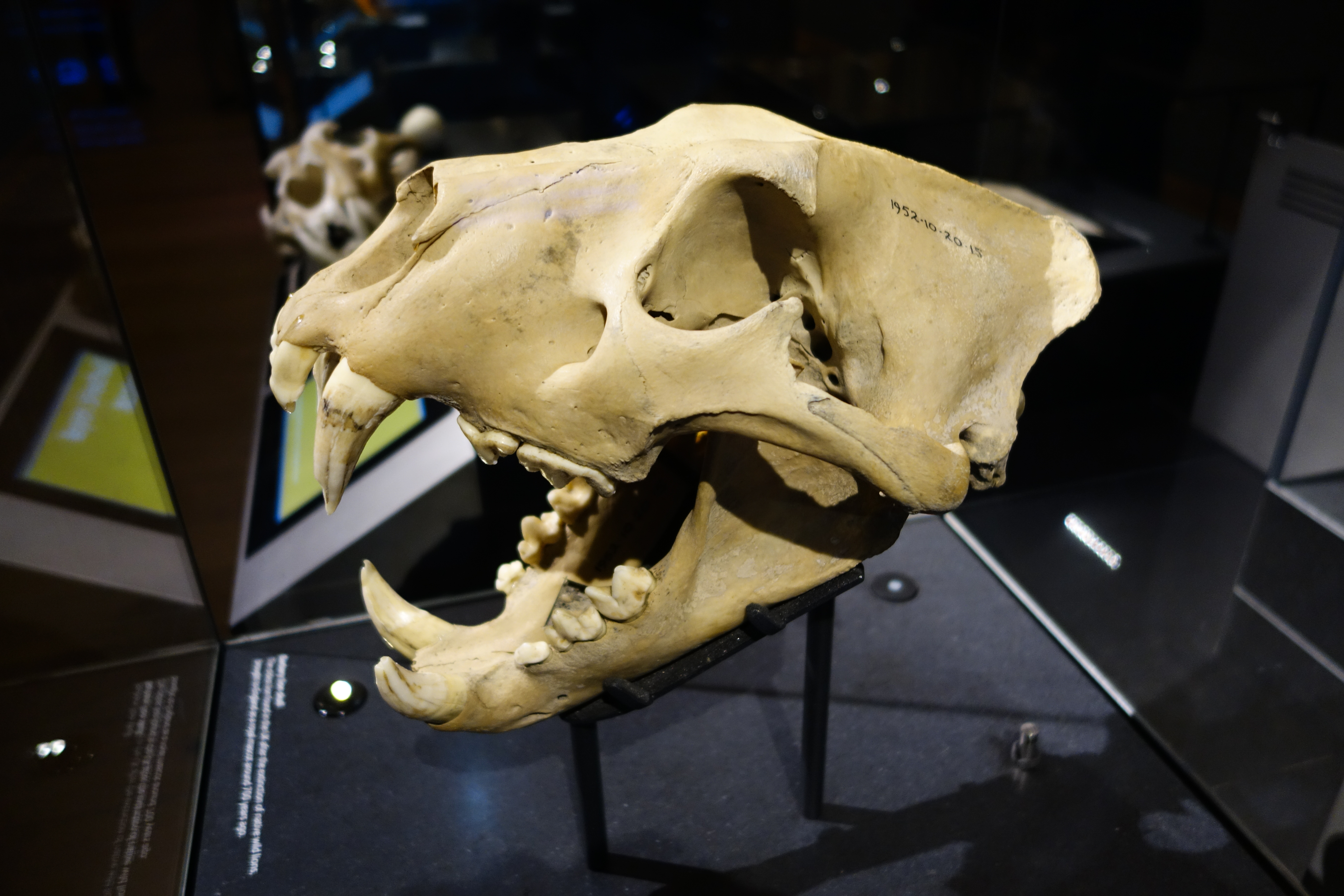
Skull of a Barbary lion that was kept at Tower of London, Natural History Museum

The lions kept in the menagerie at the Tower of London in the Middle Ages were Barbary lions, as shown by DNA testing on two well-preserved skulls excavated at the Tower in 1936 and 1937. The skulls were radiocarbon-dated to around 1280–1385 and 1420−1480.

In the 19th century and the early 20th century, lions were often kept in hotels and circus menageries. In 1835, the lions in the Tower of London were transferred to improved enclosures at the London Zoo on the orders of the Duke of Wellington.

=== Modern-day descendants ===
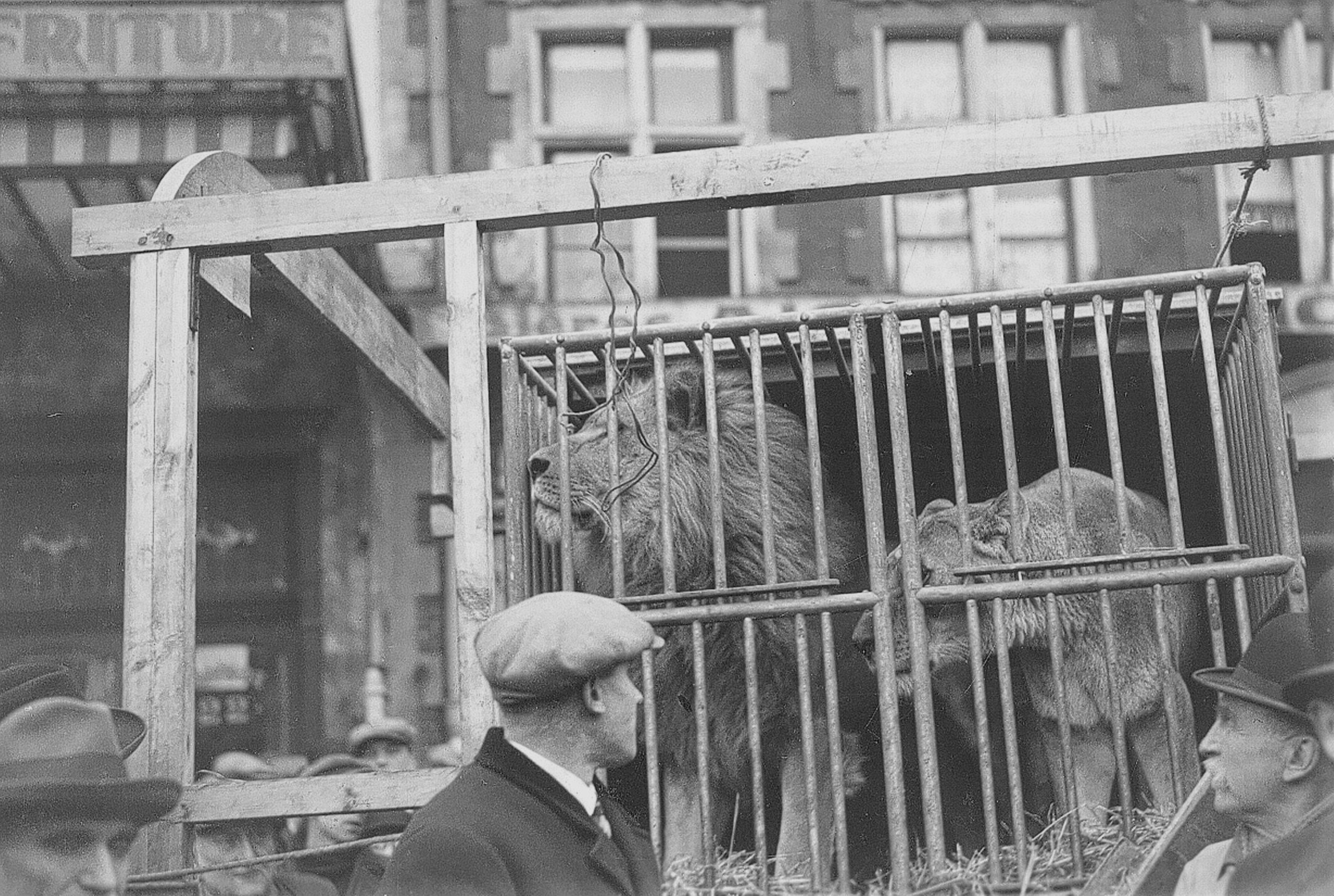
Public sale of atlas lions, Korenmarkt, Ghent (1931)

The lions in the Rabat Zoo exhibited characteristics thought typical for the Barbary lion. Nobles and Berber people presented lions as gifts to the royal family of Morocco. When the family was forced into exile in 1953, the lions in Rabat, numbering 21 altogether, were transferred to two zoos in the region. Three of these were shifted to a zoo in Casablanca, with the rest being shifted to Meknès. The lions at Meknès were moved back to the palace in 1955, but those at Casablanca never came back. In the late 1960s, new lion enclosures were built in Temara near Rabat.

At the beginning of the 21st century, the Addis Ababa Zoo kept 16 adult lions. With their dark, brown manes extending through the front legs, they looked like Barbary or Cape lions. Their ancestors were caught in southwestern Ethiopia as part of a zoological collection for Emperor Haile Selassie of Ethiopia.

Genes of the Barbary lion are present in common European zoo lions (and indirectly worldwide due to global breeding programmes), since this was one of the most frequently introduced subspecies. Several researchers and zoos supported the development of a studbook of lions directly descended from the King of Morocco's collection. Results of a mtDNA research revealed in 2006 that a lion kept in the German Neuwied Zoo originated from this collection and was likely a descendant of a Barbary lion.

Since 2005, three Barbary lions, one male and two females, have been kept in Belfast Zoo, obtained from Port Lympne Wild Animal Park, and a new Barbary lion enclosure was opened in 2023. In 2026, both female lions were euthanised.

== Cultural significance ==
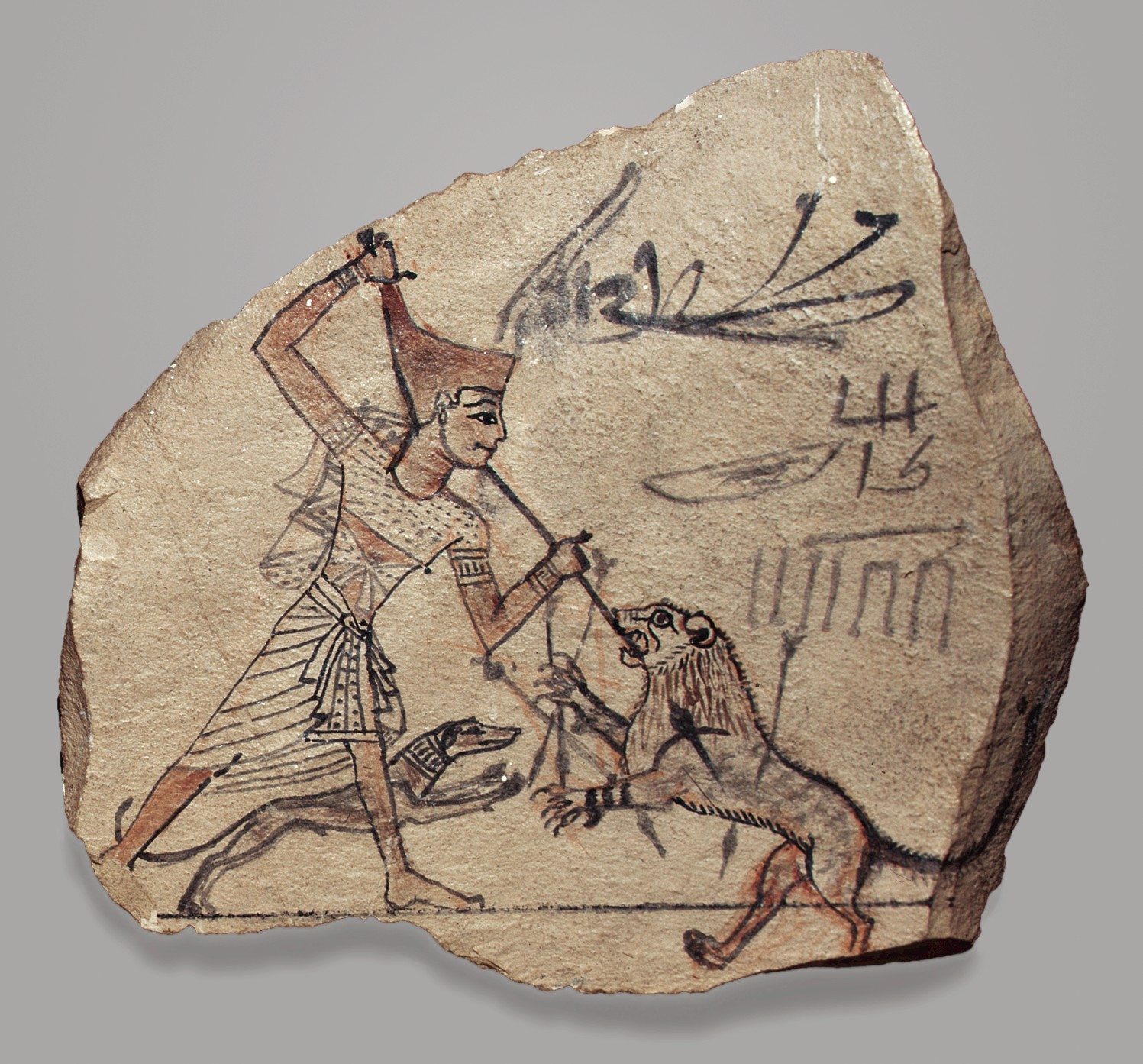
Ancient Egyptian depiction of a pharaoh spearing a lion

The lion also appeared frequently in early Egyptian art and literature. Statues and statuettes of lions found at Hierakonpolis and Koptos in Upper Egypt date to the Early Dynastic Period. The early Egyptian deity Mehit was depicted with a lion head. In Ancient Egypt, the lion-headed deity Sekhmet was venerated as protector of the country. She represented destructive power, but was also regarded as protector against famine and disease. Lion-headed figures and amulets were excavated in tombs in the Aegean islands of Crete, Euboea, Rhodes, Paros, and Chios. They are associated with Sekhmet and date to the early Iron Age between the 9th and 6th centuries BC. The remains of seven mostly subadult lions were excavated at the necropolis Umm El Qa'ab in a tomb of Hor-Aha, dated to the 31st century BC. In 2001, the skeleton of a mummified lion was found in the tomb of Maïa in a necropolis dedicated to Tutankhamun at Saqqara. It had probably lived and died in the Ptolemaic period, showed signs of malnutrition and had probably lived in captivity for many years.

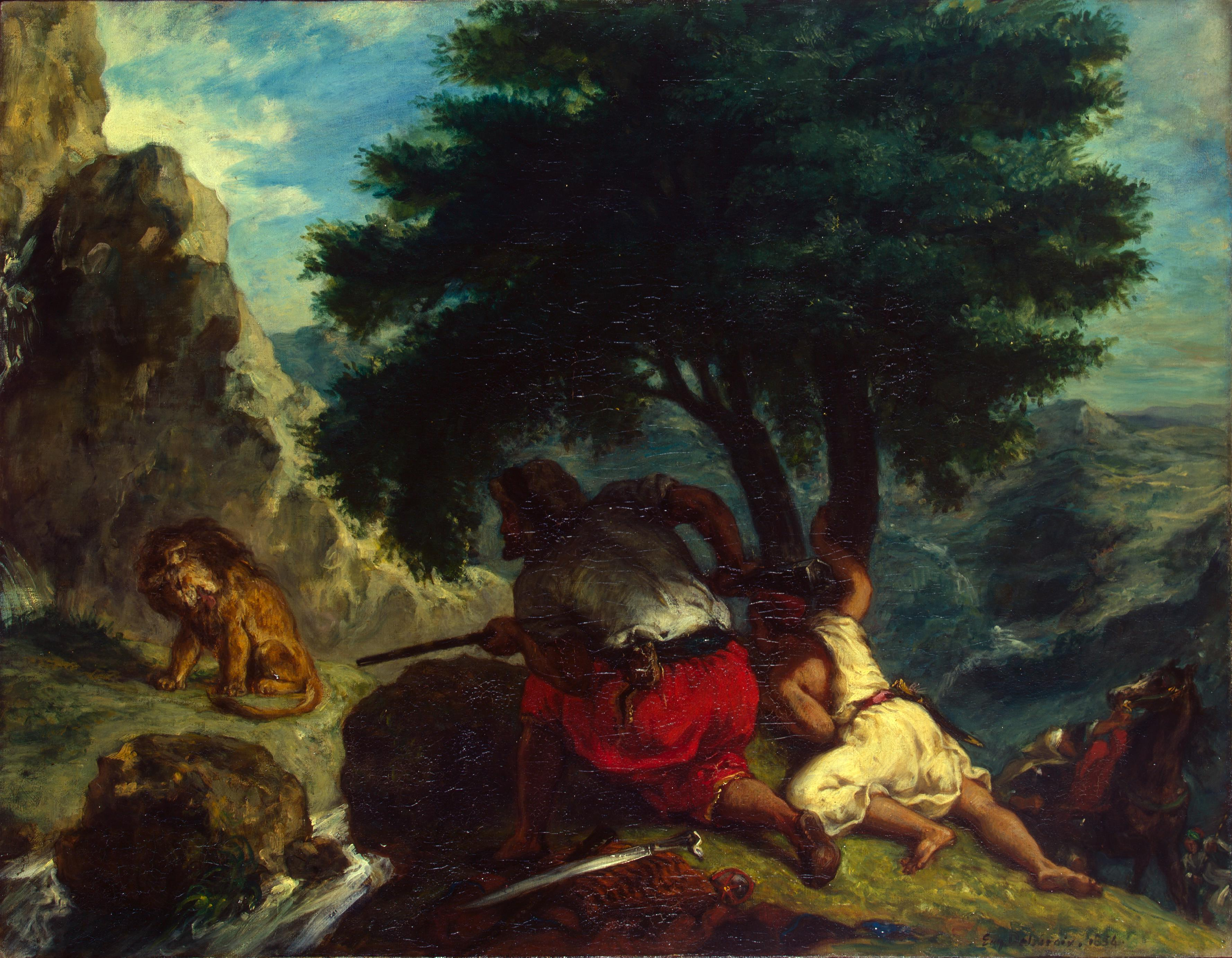
Painting of a lion hunt in Morocco by Eugène Delacroix, 1855, in the Hermitage Museum

The Barbary lion is a symbol in Nubian culture and was often depicted in art and architecture. Nubian deities, such as Amun, Amesemi, Apedemak, Arensnuphis, Hathor, Bastet, Dedun, Mehit, Menhit, and Sebiumeker, were depicted as lion protectors in Kushite religion.

In Roman North Africa, lions were regularly captured by experienced hunters for venatio spectacles in amphitheatres.

The Morocco national football team is nicknamed the "Atlas Lions", and the supporters are usually seen wearing T-shirts with a lion's face or wearing a lion suit.

== See also ==
  - Wild cats in Africa:
  - Cheetah
  - African golden cat
  - Caracal
  - Serval
  - African wildcat
  - Sand cat
  - Black-footed cat
- History of lions in Europe
- Holocene extinction
- Cats in Ancient Egypt
- Lion-baiting
- Lake Akfadou
