= New Kalabsha =

Archaeological site in Egypt

Coordinates: 23°57′39″N 32°52′2″E

Locations of Old and New Kalabsha

New Kalabsha is a promontory located near Aswan in Egypt.

Created during the International Campaign to Save the Monuments of Nubia, it houses several important temples, structures, and other remains that have been relocated here from the site of Old Kalabsha (Arabic: باب الكلابشة Bāb al-Kalābsha, "Gate of Kalabsha", Ancient Greek: Ταλμις Talmis) and other sites in Lower Nubia, to avoid the rising waters of Lake Nasser caused by the construction of the Aswan High Dam. The major remains are described below:

== Kalabsha Temple ==
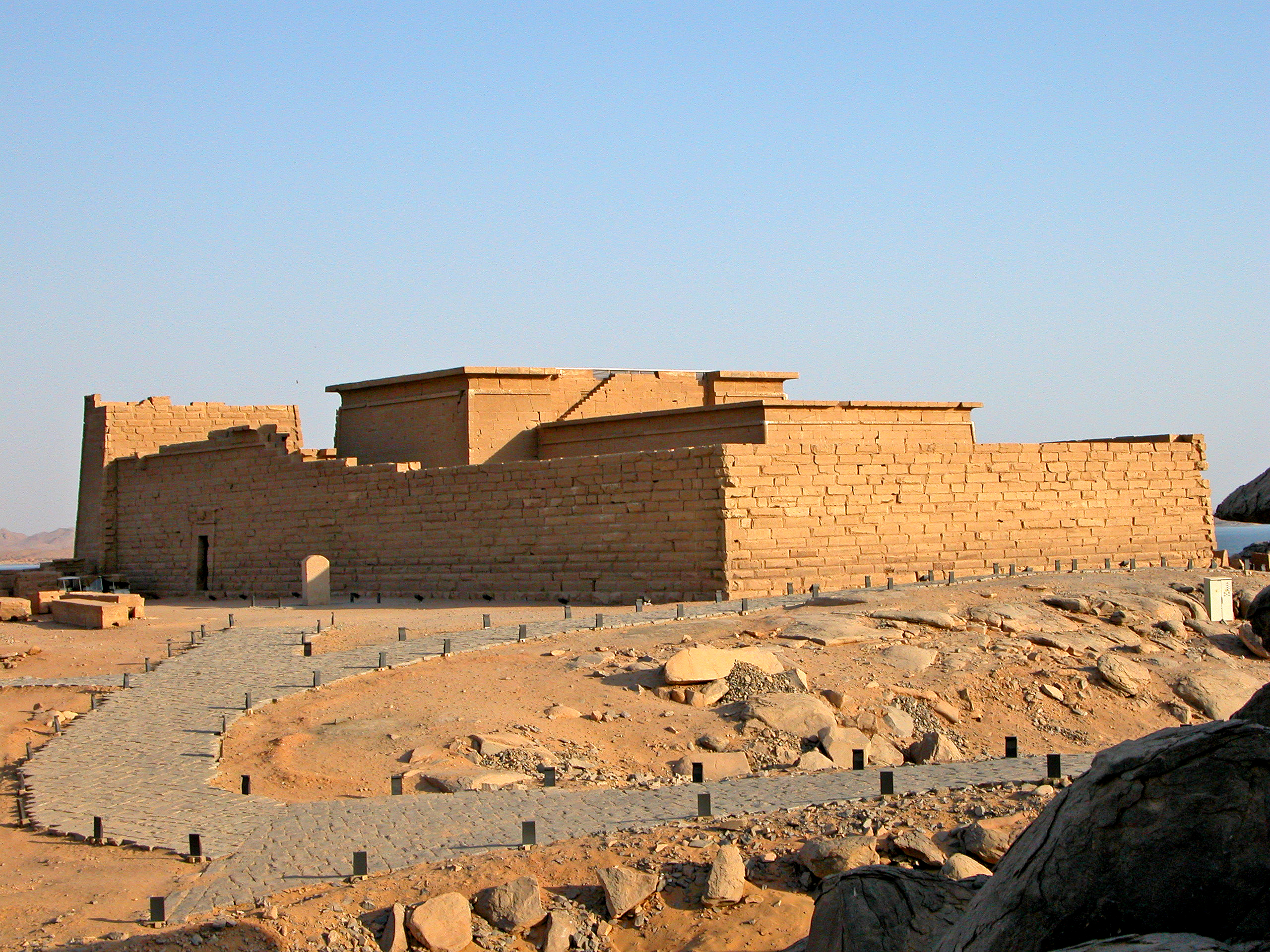
Temple of Kalabsha

The Temple of Kalabsha (or Temple of Mandulis) is the major structure in New Kalabsha. The entire Roman period temple to the sun god Mandulis was relocated here in 1970. It was built by Emperor Augustus and was the largest free-standing temple of Egyptian Nubia. During relocation, the temple was cut into 13,000 blocks.

== Gerf Hussein ==
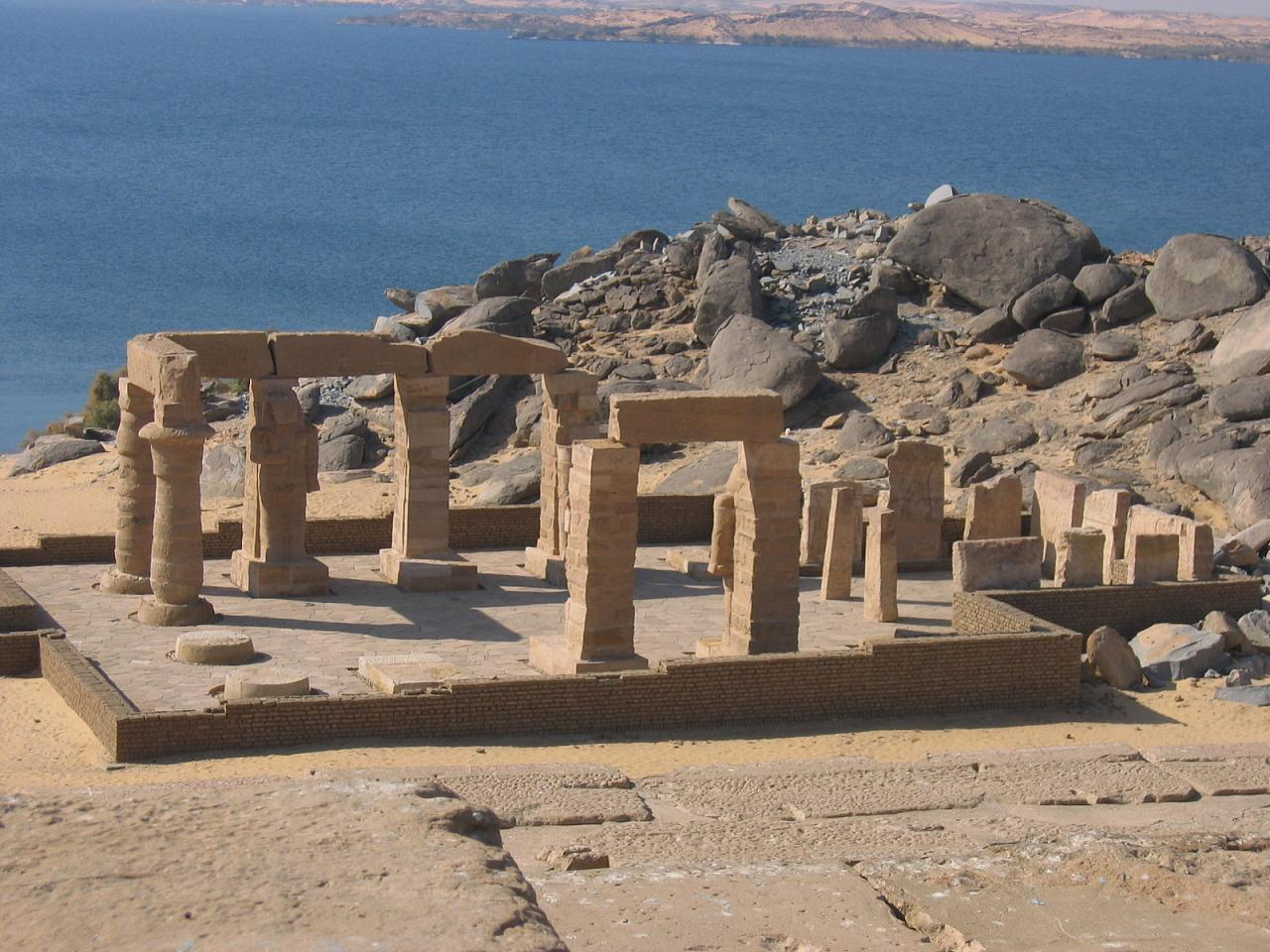
Gerf Hussein

The temple of Gerf Hussein (originally known as Per Ptah, the "House of Ptah") is dedicated to Ramesses II and was built by the Viceroy of Nubia Setau. Originally, it was partially free-standing and partially rock-cut. During the flooding of Lake Nasser, the free-standing section was dismantled and then rebuilt at New Kalabsha. Most of the rock-cut temple was left in place and is now submerged beneath the waters.

== Beit el-Wali ==
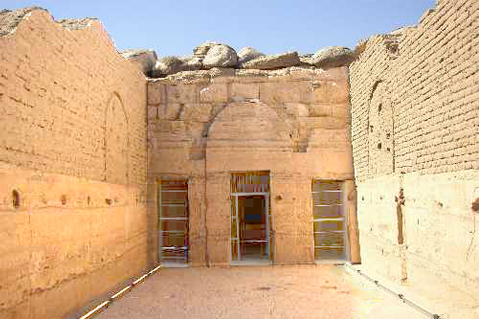
Beit el-Wali

The rock-cut temple of Beit el-Wali was moved from its original location by a Polish archaeological team. It is dedicated to Ramesses II, and the gods of Amun and Anukis (among others). It was originally decorated in bright colors, but these were mostly removed by a "squeeze" taken in the 19th century (the results of this squeeze are now on display in the British Museum).

== Kiosk of Qertassi ==
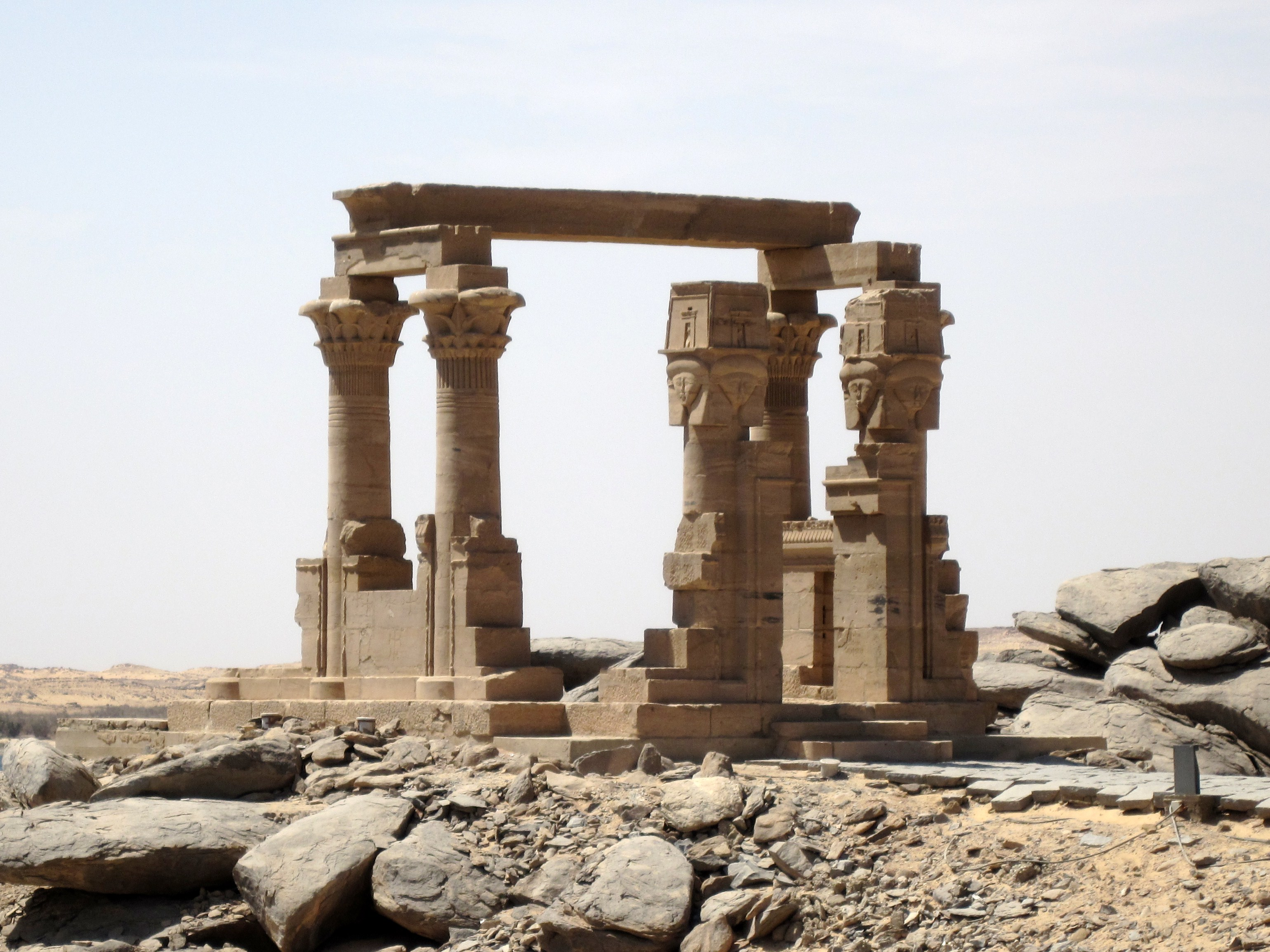
Kiosk of Qertassi

The Kiosk of Qertassi is "a tiny Roman kiosk with four slender papyrus columns inside [and] two Hathor columns at the entrance." It is a small but elegant structure that "is unfinished and not inscribed with the name of the architect, but is probably contemporary with Trajan's Kiosk at Philae."

== Dedwen ==
Originally located within the outer wall of the temple of Kalabsha, and is dedicated to the Nubian serpent god, Dedwen. It was moved along with the Kalabsha temple to New Kalabsha.
