= Egyptien de tradition =

Artificial language variety that imitates older Egyptian language varieties

Égyptien de tradition (term is a French terminus technicus), also known as Traditional Egyptian, is a literary and religious hieroglyphic written language artificially cultivated in ancient Egypt from the later New Kingdom until the Greco-Roman Period (14th century BCE - 4th century CE). It is based on older varieties of Egyptian, in particular Middle Egyptian (therefore also referred to as "Neo-Middle Egyptian", or "Late-Middle Egyptian") but in some cases also contains characteristics of Old Egyptian, Late Egyptian, or Demotic.

More on the basis of significantly different hieroglyphic orthography than linguistic characteristics, a distinction is usually made between:

- classical Égyptien de tradition, written in the classical hieroglyphic writing system (from the 14th century BC)
- “Ptolemaic” (Égyptien de tradition of the Greco-Roman Period with its own characteristic hieroglyphic, “Ptolemaic” writing system; from the 4th century BC)

The last hieroglyphic inscription, written in Égyptien de tradition, dates to the end of the 4th century AD.

== Variations ==
Concrete traditional Egyptian texts or groups of texts eventually show different mixtures of older Egyptian grammatical phenomena and vocabulary, and occasionally they also show historically unattested, peculiar grammatical phenomena. It would therefore make sense to speak of “Égyptiens de tradition” in plural.

== Literature ==
- Classical pre-Ptolemaic Égyptien de tradition
  - Pascal Vernus: Traditional Egyptian I (Dynamics), https://escholarship.org/uc/item/0bg342rh, in: UCLA Encyclopedia of Egyptology, 1(1). 2016.
  - Karl Jansen-Winkeln: Spätmittelägyptische Grammatik der Texte der 3. Zwischenzeit (= Ägypten und Altes Testament. Band 34). Harrassowitz, Wiesbaden 1996, ISBN 3-447-03800-4.
  - Jacqueline Lustman: Étude grammaticale du Papyrus Bremner-Rhind, Paris 1999.
  - Peter Der Manuelian: Living in the Past. Studies in Archaism of the Egyptian Twenty-sixth Dynasty (= Studies in Egyptology), Kegan Paul International, London 1994.
  - Daniel A. Werning (2011), Das Höhlenbuch. Textkritische Edition und Textgrammatik, Göttinger Orientforschungen, IV. Reihe: Ägypten, 48, 1, Wiesbaden: Otto Harrassowitz, ISBN 978-3-447-06635-8
- Ptolemaic
  - Åke Engsheden: Traditional Egyptian II (Ptolemaic, Roman), https://escholarship.org/uc/item/8g73w3gp, in: UCLA Encyclopedia of Egyptology, 1(1). 2016.
  - Dieter Kurth: Einführung ins Ptolemäische. 2 Bände. Backe-Verlag, Hützel 2007/2008, ISBN 978-3-9810869-1-1, ISBN 978-3-9810869-3-5.
  - Penelope Wilson: A Ptolemaic lexikon: a lexicographical study of the texts in the Temple of Edfu (= Orientalia Lovaniensia analecta. Band 78). Peeters, Leuven 1997, ISBN 90-6831-933-7.
  - Åke Engsheden: La reconstitution du verbe en égyptien de tradition 400-30 avant J.-C. (= Uppsala Studies in Egyptology 3), Uppsala 2003.
