= Mandulis =

Ancient Nubian deity

- God of the Sun and Sky
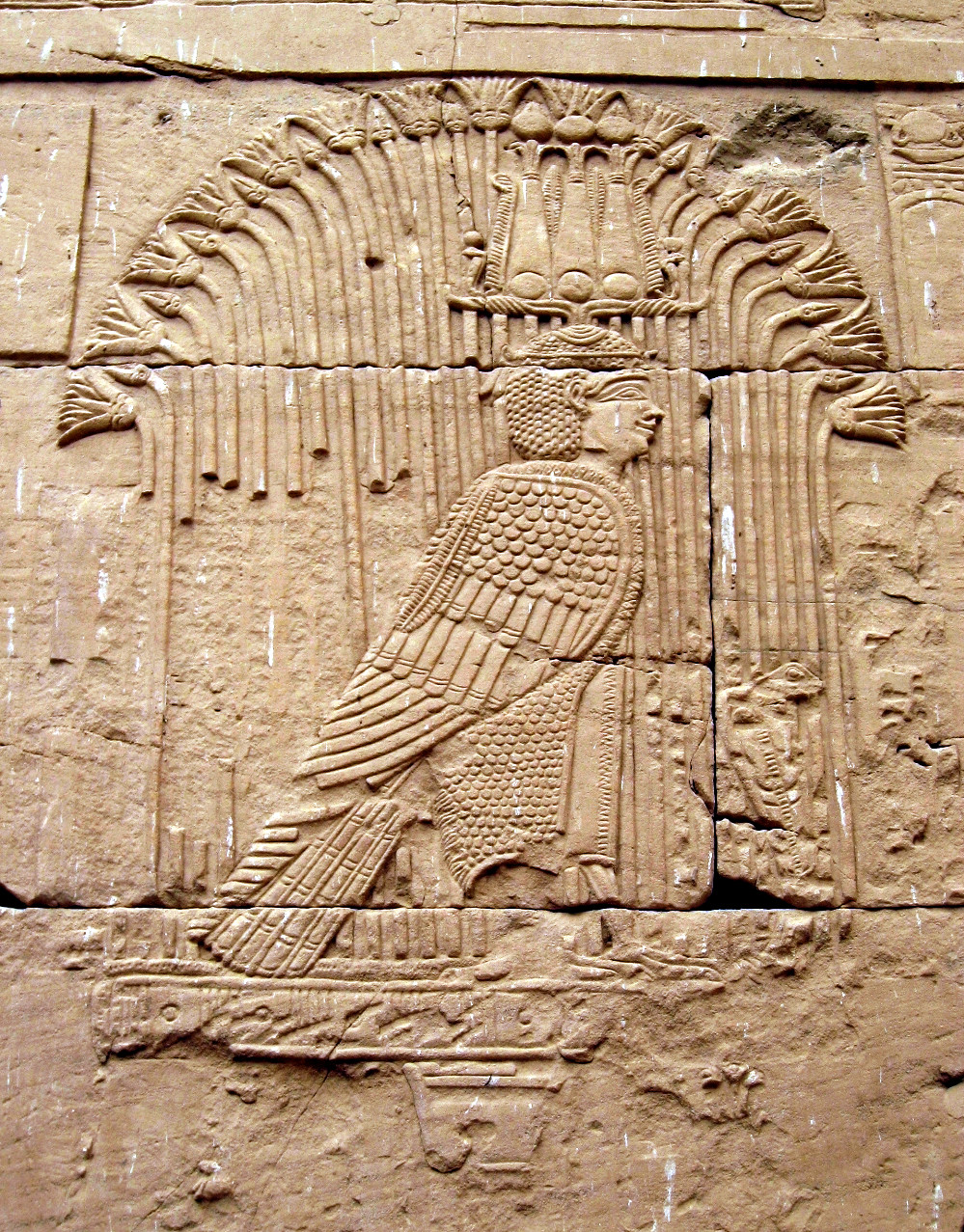
- An image of Mandulis from the Temple of Kalabsha in Nubia
Name in hieroglyphs
U6 D21 G43 E23 Z2 A40
- Venerated in: Nubian mythology
- Animals: Falcon
- Symbol: Sun, Crown of Ram Horns, Plumes
- Region: Lower Nubia
- Temple: Temple of Kalabsha

Equivalents
- Egyptian: Horus

Mandulis (also Merul and Melul) was a god of ancient Nubia also worshipped in Egypt. The name Mandulis (Μανδουλις) is the Greek form of Merul or Melul, a non-Egyptian name. The centre of his cult was the Temple of Kalabsha at Talmis, but he also had a temple dedicated to him at Ajuala.

The worship of Mandulis was unknown to Egypt under the native Pharaohs, the Temple of Kalabsha being constructed under the Ptolemies (305 to 30 BC). The temple was popular during the Roman period. It was expanded under the emperors Augustus (27 BC–AD 14) and Vespasian (AD 69–79). A series of dated inscriptions can be found in the temple from the reign of Vespasian down to AD 248 or 249. In one of these he is identified as the "Sun, the all-seeing master, king of all, all-powerful Aion."

Besides his own temples at Kalabsha and Ajuala, Mandulis was worshiped in the Temple of Petesi and Pihor at Dendur and at Philae. An inscription at Dendur identifies him as the "great god, lord of Talmis", clearly indicating the centre of his cult. At Philae, he is depicted in humanoid form on a wall next to the last known hieroglyphic inscription, which was dedicated to him in AD 394.

== Iconography ==
Drawing of Mandulis based on a relief from the Temple of Kalabsha

Mandulis was often depicted wearing the Hemhem crown. He was sometimes shown in the form of a falcon but with a human head.
