= Sebiumeker =

Ancient Nubian deity

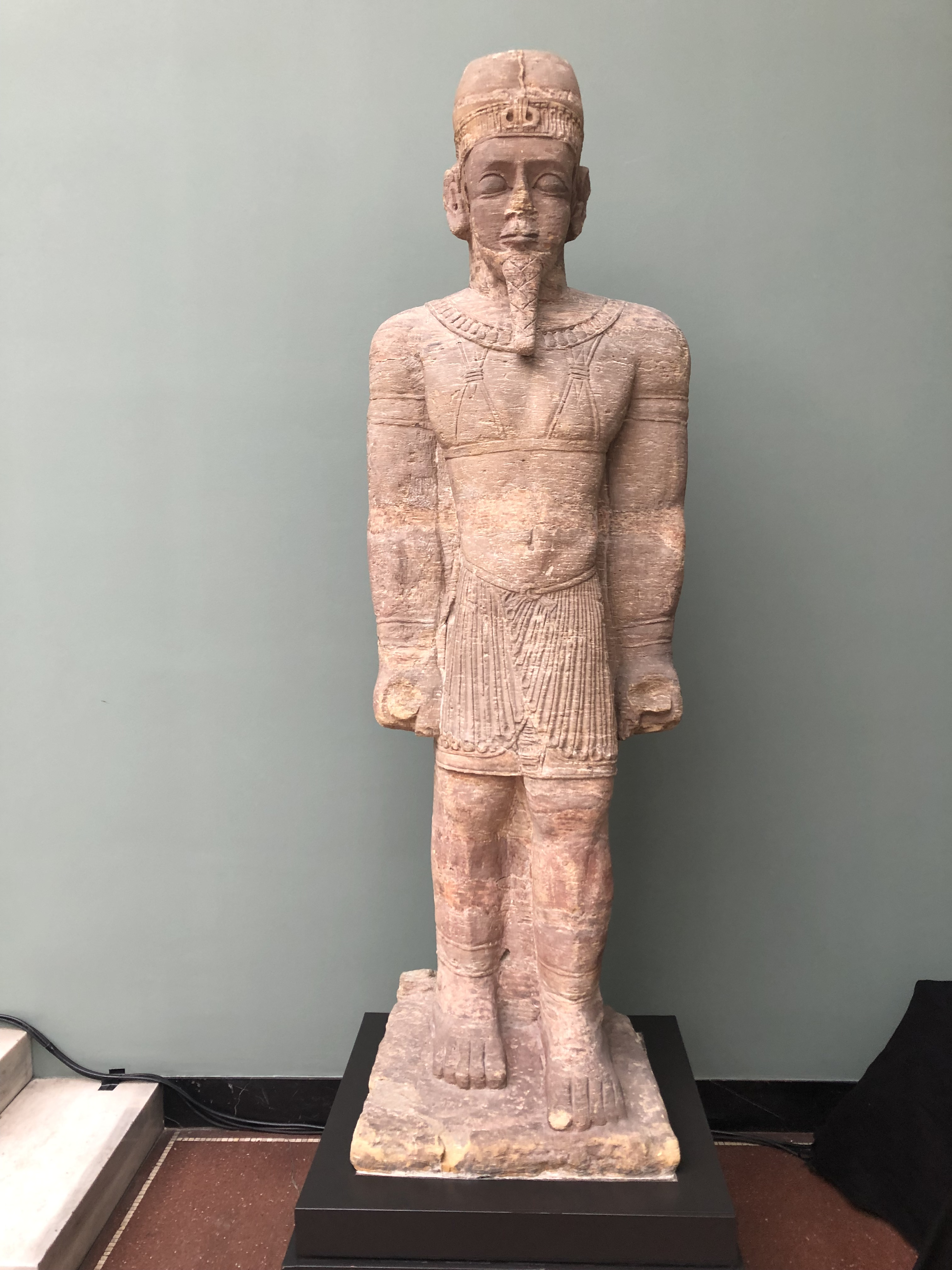
- Sebiumeker statue in the Carlsberg Glyptotek museum 1st century BCE
- Major cult center: Meroe, Kush

Genealogy
- Siblings: Arensnuphis ?

Sebiumeker was a major supreme god of procreation and fertility in Nubian mythology who was primarily worshipped in Meroe, Kush, in present-day Sudan. He is sometimes thought of as a guardian of gateways as his statues are sometimes found near doorways. He has many similarities with Atum, but has Nubian characteristics, and is also considered the god of agriculture.

== Etymology ==
His Meroitic name was probably Sabomakal, which became Sebiumeker in the ancient Egyptian language.

== Role in ancient Kush ==
Sebiumeker was a major supreme god of procreation and fertility in Meroe, Kush (present-day Sudan).

He was referred to as Lord of Musawwarat. His statues have often been found near doorways at the Nubian sites Tabo (Nubia) and Musawwarat es-Sufra, giving rise to the interpretation that he was a guardian god. But another interpretation is that he represented transformation which is why he was placed at the doorways of temples.

Though certainly a Nubian god, he has many Egyptian symbols and legends.

== Family ==
His partner (or maybe brother) was Arensnuphis. This close association with Arensnuphis is similar to the relationship with Set and Osiris.

== Image ==
He wore the ancient double crown with a beard and uraeus and had big ears, a mark of importance. With his double crown, false beard, kilt, and tunic, he resembles Atum.

A sandstone head without inscription stands in Meroe. It also has the double crown with uraeus. It has several Egyptian looking features, but also has the formal broad Nubian unmodeled planes.

== In popular culture ==
His worship is invoked in the Gifts of the Nile scenario in the strategy video game Civilization VI.
