= Graffito of Esmet-Akhom =

Last known inscription written in Egyptian hieroglyphs (394 AD)

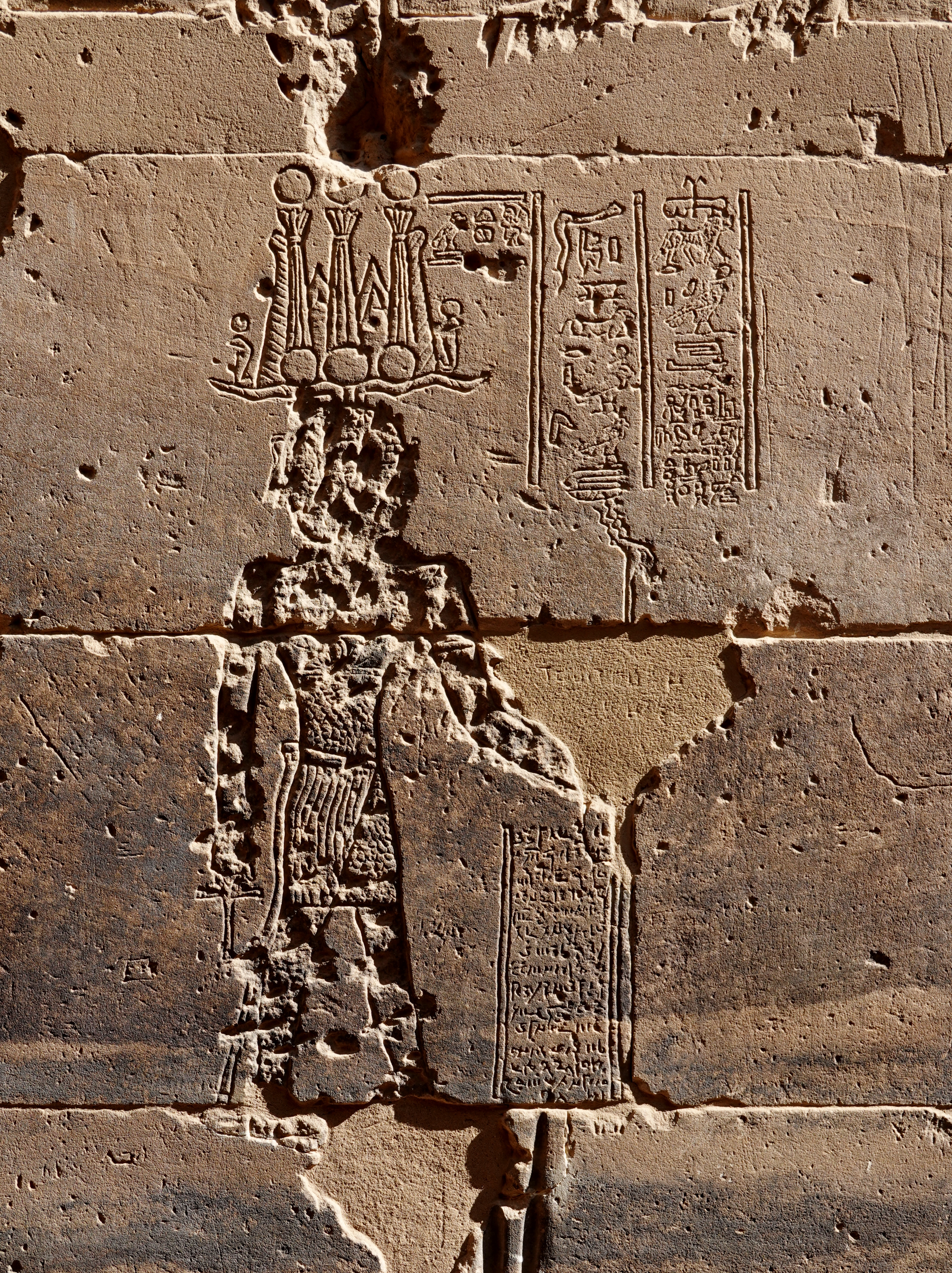
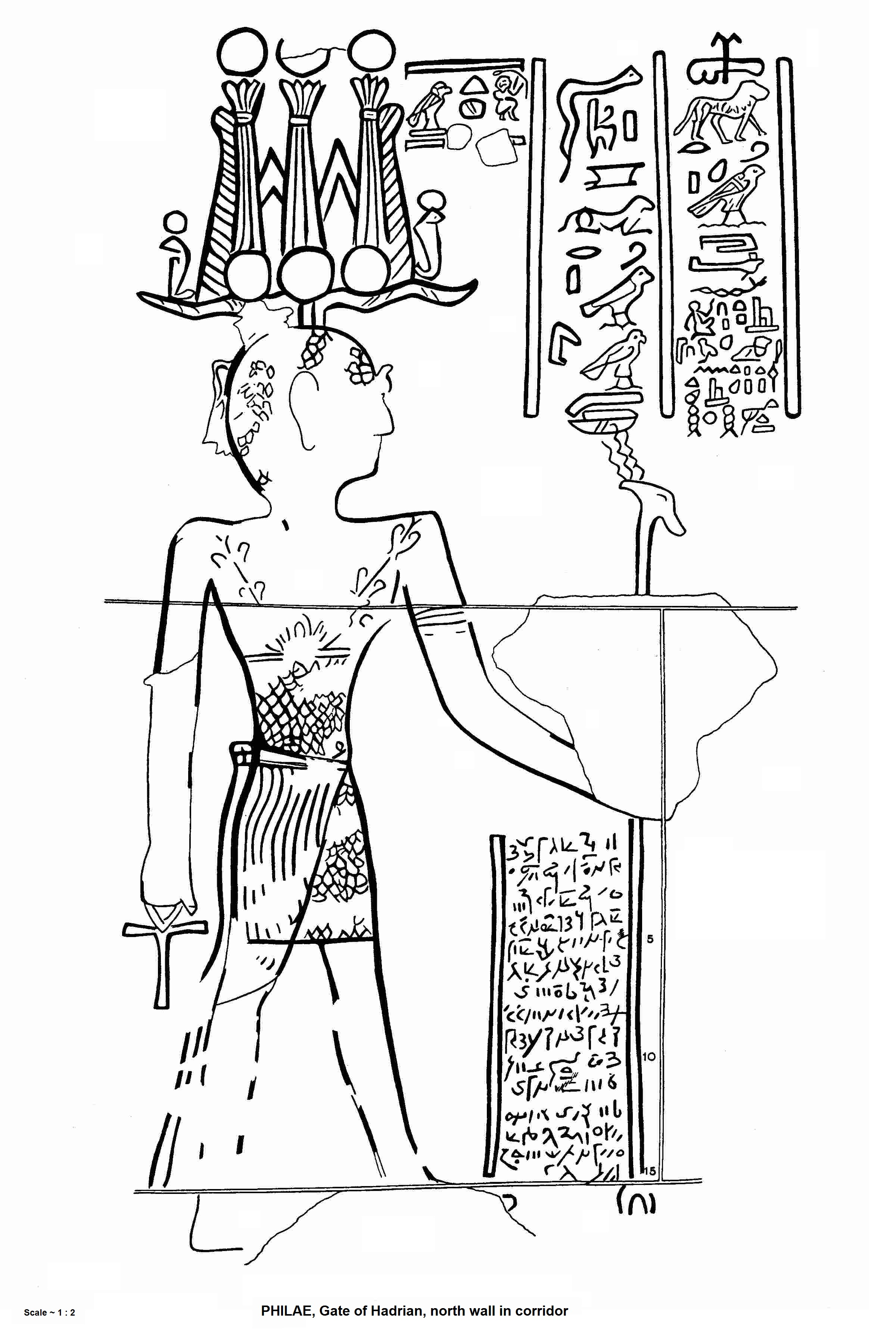
Photograph of the graffito (left) and a detailed drawing (right)

The Graffito of Esmet-Akhom, also known by its designation Philae 436 or GPH 436, is the last known ancient Egyptian inscription written in Egyptian hieroglyphs, carved on 24 August AD 394. The inscription, carved in the temple of Philae in southern Egypt, was created by a priest named Nesmeterakhem (or Esmet-Akhom) (Note: The name of the creator of the graffito was translated as Nesmeterakhem by Carol Andrews in 1999, whose translation of the inscriptions themselves are used in this article. Another often used translation of the name is Esmet-Akhom or Smet-Akhom.) and consists of a carved figure of the god Mandulis as well as an accompanying text in which Nesmeterakhem hopes his inscription will last "for all time and eternity". The inscription also contains a text in the demotic script, with similar content.

The temple at Philae was a prominent site of worship for the ancient Egyptian religion, as it was believed to be one of the burial places of the god Osiris. The primary deity of worship was Isis, the sister-wife of Osiris, though several other deities are also recorded to have been worshipped at the temple. Several deities originally from Nubia in the south, including Mandulis, were also worshipped. The inscription by Nesmeterakhem is from after the closing of the pagan temples of Egypt by the Roman emperor Theodosius I in 391 or 392; the Philae temple survived as it was just outside the borders of the Roman Empire.

Nesmeterakhem belonged to a family of priests who staffed the temple; due to the Christianization of Egypt, it is possible that belief in the old Egyptian gods by Nesmeterakhem's time did not extend far beyond his own immediate family. Shortly after the 394 inscription was made, it is likely that there was no longer anyone alive who could read the hieroglyphs. Later graffiti and inscriptions are known from Philae, but they were written in either demotic or Greek. The Philae temple, seemingly continually staffed by members of Nesmeterakhem's family, was finally closed on the orders of Emperor Justinian I between 535 and 537, marking the end of the last vestige of the ancient Egyptian culture.

== Inscriptions ==
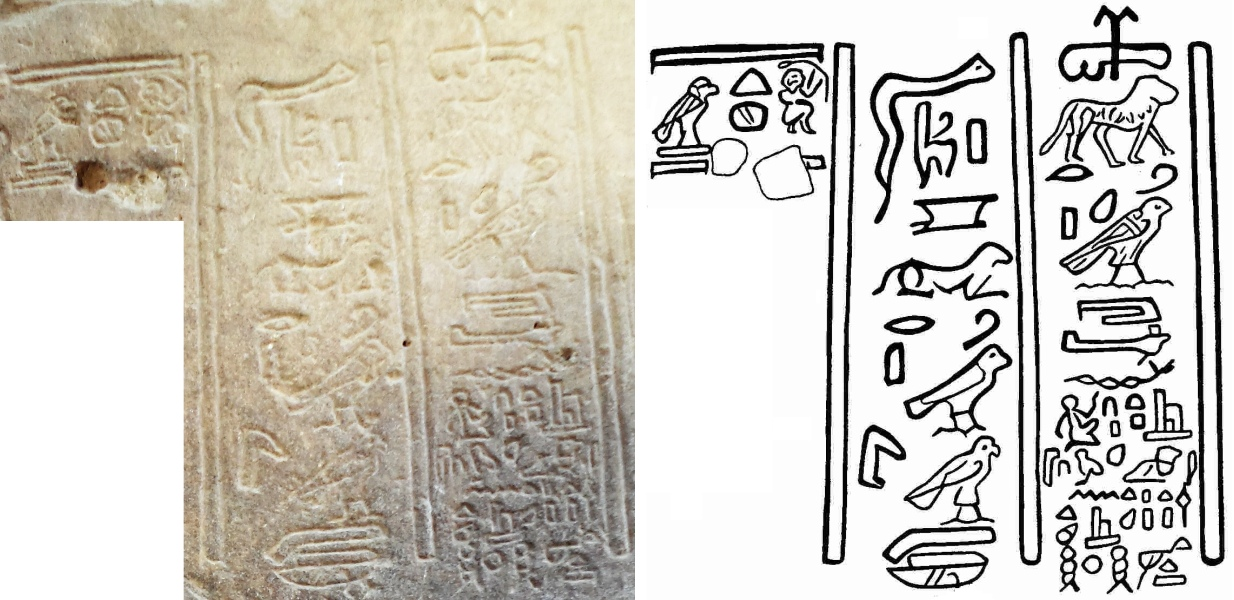
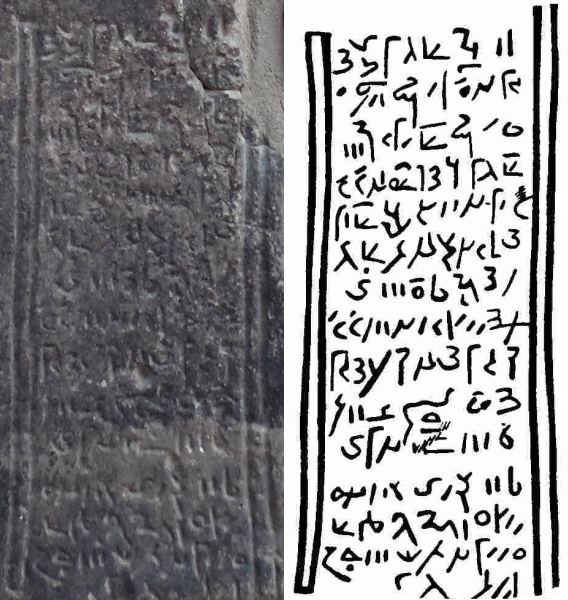
Photographs and drawings of the hieroglyphic (top) and demotic (bottom) inscriptions

The graffito consists of two inscriptions, one written in Egyptian hieroglyphs and the other written in the Egyptian demotic script. The inscriptions are accompanied by a carved figure, representing the god Mandulis. The hieroglyphs are carved to the right of Mandulis's head, and the demotic script is carved to the left of his staff.

=== Hieroglyphic inscription ===
Translated into English, the hieroglyphic inscription reads:

Before Mandulis, son of Horus, by the hand of Nesmeterakhem, son of Nesmeter, the Second Priest of Isis, for all time and eternity. Words spoken by Mandulis, lord of the Abaton, great god.

=== Demotic inscription ===
Translated into English, the demotic inscription reads:

I, Nesmeterakhem, the Scribe of the House of Writings(?) of Isis, son of Nesmeterpanakhet the Second Priest of Isis, and his mother Eseweret, I performed work on this figure of Mandulis for all time, because he is fair of face towards me. Today, the Birthday of Osiris, his dedication feast, year 110.

== Context ==
=== Religious context ===
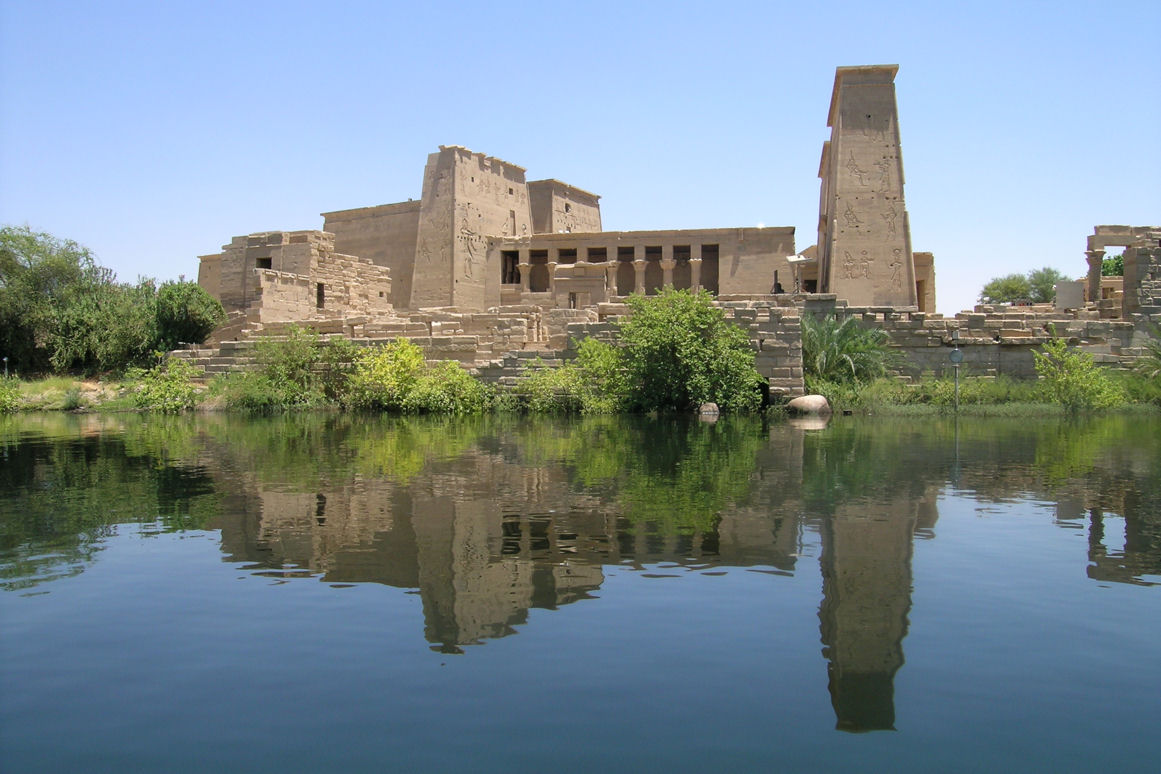
The ruins of the temple complex of Philae

The inscriptions are from Philae, a prominent ancient Egyptian temple complex. Throughout ancient Egypt's history, Philae was held in high regard as one of the supposed burial places of the god Osiris. As it was located in the far south of Egypt, it was historically an important place of pilgrimage for followers of the Egyptian religion to the south of Egypt, particularly the populace of the Kingdom of Kush (c. 1000 BC – 350 AD). The inscriptions were carved on a gateway that was added to the temple by the Roman emperor Hadrian (r. 117–138); this gateway leading directly towards the Abaton, the sanctuary which was said to enclose the tomb of Osiris's remains. Despite the close association with Osiris, the temple was mainly devoted to the goddess Isis, though there is also evidence for worship of deities such as Hathor, Imhotep, Khnum and Nephthys. Because of its geographical proximity to Nubia in the south, the temple was also a site of worship of the various originally Nubian deities that were also recognized in the Egyptian religion.

Mandulis was one of these Nubian deities that were also worshipped throughout Egypt. Mandulis was relatively prominent, and was seen at least in southern Egypt as a son of the god Horus. Greek and Roman travellers and authors saw Mandulis as a form of the Greek god Aion. Due to its geographical location, it is unclear whether Philae was staffed by Egyptians or Nubians. As can be gathered from the inscriptions, they were written by a priest of Isis named Nesmeterakhem. Nesmeterakhem was at least a third-generation priest of the temple, his father Nesmeterpanakhet and his grandfather Pakhom also having been priests at Philae. In the inscriptions, Nesmeterakhem is described as "Scribe of the House of Writings", significant since it demonstrates that he worked with the sacred writings (i.e. hieroglyphs). Traditionally, hieroglyphs were seen as the actual writings of the gods.

=== Historical context ===
An edict issued by Emperor Theodosius I (r. 379–395) in 391 or 392 closed the pagan temples of Egypt. Theodosius's edict also brought an end to the use of hieroglyphs in monumental inscriptions. In the reign of the Emperor Diocletian (r. 285–305), the Egyptian borders of the Roman Empire were moved back to Aswan. This border change left Philae outside of the empire, which allowed the temple to survive despite Theodosius's edict. The temple at Philae continued to endure due to the patronage of the Blemmye tribe, who lived in the Red Sea Hills, south-east of Egypt, but followed the old Egyptian religion. The Blemmyes continued to visit the temple to pay homage to Osiris and Isis. It is likely that traditional festivals, attended by the local priests and pilgrims, continued to be celebrated as long as the temple remained operational.

The date inscribed in the demotic inscription, the "Birthday of Osiris" in year 110, corresponds to 24 August 394 in the Gregorian calendar, 40 years later than the second last known hieroglyphic inscription. "Year 110" is counted from the accession of Diocletian. In ancient Egypt, years were typically counted from the accession of the current pharaoh, (Note: After Egypt was incorporated into the Roman Empire in 30 BC, the Egyptians considered the Roman emperors to be pharaohs, succeeding the previous series of dynasties based in Egypt itself.) but the priests at Philae after the Christianization of the Roman Empire continued to posthumously count from Diocletian's accession since most of the emperors thereafter were Christian and suppressed the old Egyptian religion. (Note: The last emperor to be acknowledged as pharaoh was not Diocletian, but Maximinus Daza (r. 310–313), the last aggressively pagan Roman emperor. The priests at Philae may have preferred dating from Diocletian since Diocletian was the last emperor to take any substantial interest in the temple and its surrounding lands. Alternatively, if they were Nubians, it might have served as commemoration for Diocletian as the emperor who gave the lands their temple was located in to the Nubians by moving the Roman border north.)

==== Later activity at Philae ====
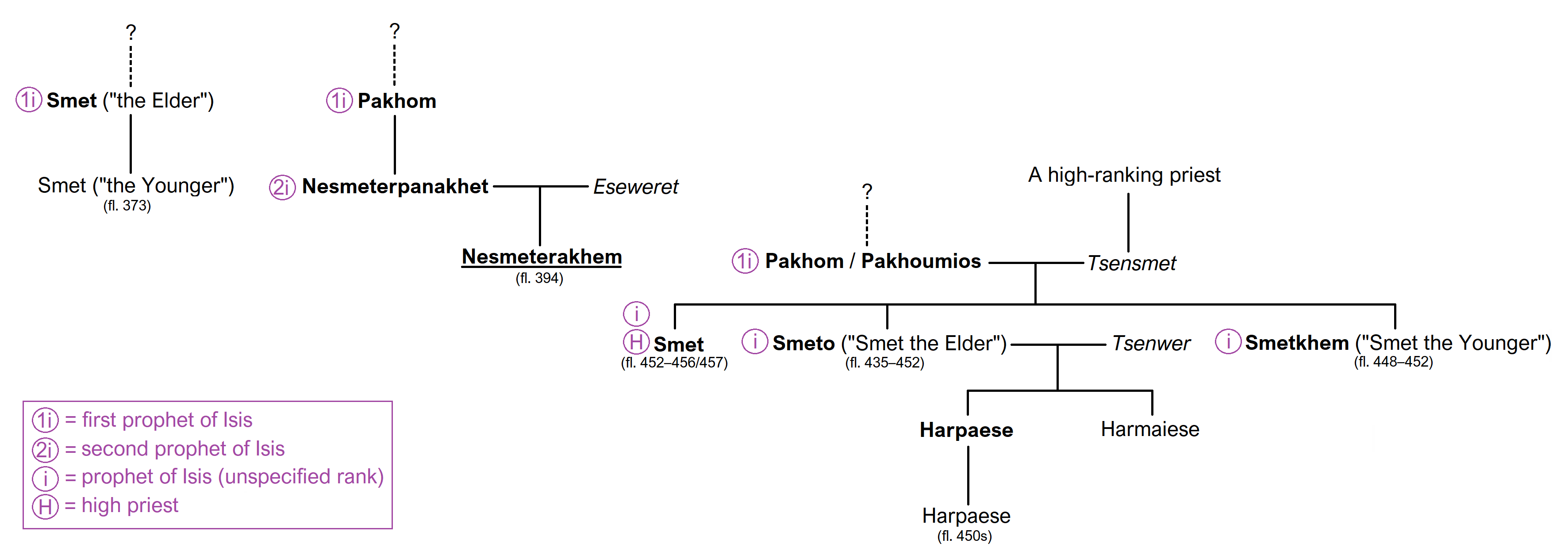
Reconstructed family tree of the "Smet" family, to which many of the late writers of inscriptions at Philae, including Nesmeterakhem (underlined), belonged. Some figures of uncertain association are omitted.

Relatively soon after Nesmeterakhem made his inscription, there was likely no one alive who could read its hieroglyphs. Knowledge of both hieroglyphs and demotic script had gradually disappeared from Egypt during the decades of Christianization, as Greek became more prominent. The demotic inscriptions at Philae are also considerably later than other known demotic writings. The latest known example of demotic from outside Philae is a text probably from Sohag, dated to 290. The demotic inscription accompanying Nesmeterakhem's hieroglyphs is the last known demotic inscription written by a priest to mention Osiris. Later inscriptions by the local priests, one written in Greek and eight written in demotic, are known from Philae and discuss religious activity taking place there, but they do not explicitly mention Osiris by name. In an effort to close the last Egyptian temples, the Byzantine general Maximinus campaigned against the Blemmyes in the 450s, around the time of the Council of Chalcedon (451). Maximinus was unsuccessful however, and the campaign ended with a treaty that still allowed annual worship at the temple.

Among the later inscriptions at Philae is the last known inscription in demotic, carved on the roof of the porch of the great temple dedicated to Isis and dated to 11 December 452. This very faint inscription reads "the feet of Panakhetet the lesser", presumably originally having been accompanied by a drawing of feet, commemorating a pilgrimage to the temple. The last known inscription to mention Osiris, written by a pilgrim and not a priest, was written in Greek on 20 December 452 at the entrance of the Abaton by "Smetkhem, son of Pakhoumios". This inscription records that Smetkhem came to the temple with his brother Smeto and "fulfilled his duty", and thanks both Isis and Osiris "for the good". The last known inscription from Philae to mention any pagan religious activity is from the exterior wall of the temple of Isis. Dated to 456/457, the preserved portion of this damaged inscription reads "when Smet was archprophet, Pasnous, son of Pakhumios, was first president of the cult association". Based on the names recorded in the different late inscriptions, it appears that many of the writers were part of the same family; it is unclear whether the late worship of the Egyptian deities extended outside of this single family.

From the late fourth century onwards there had also been Christian churches on the same island as the temple. The temple was finally closed at some point between 535 and 537, when Emperor Justinian I (r. 527–565) ordered it to be closed and its priests to be imprisoned, sending the general Narses to retrieve its statues to take them to Constantinople. By this time, the temple was probably staffed by a very small number of individuals and no longer supported by any significant southern geopolitical entity, with these lands now mostly being Christianized. The temple's closure marked the final end of the ancient Egyptian culture. After its closure, the temple was converted into a church and dedicated to Saint Stephen.

== Analysis ==
Throughout Egyptian history, hieroglyphs were closely associated with elite and religious display. The egyptologist Richard B. Parkinson considers it fitting that the last known use of hieroglyphs is in connection with the image of a deity. The ancient Egyptians sometimes employed non-standard hieroglyphs to produce an early form of cryptography. Such cryptographic writings were probably not attempts at secret communication, but they may have served religious purposes—in religious contexts it may have served to warn readers that they were dealing in some way with the dangerous and awesome realms of the gods. Nesmeterakhem appears to have been familiar with Egyptian cryptography, given that the hieroglyphic inscription contains an uncommon sign substitution. When writing the first part of his father Nesmeterpanakhet's name in hieroglyphs, Nesmeterakhem spelled it ns-mtr, using the Hedjet (white crown) sign for the ns portion. This sign is only used to represent ns or nsw.t in cryptography.

The depiction of Mandulis accompanying the inscriptions was at some point deliberately damaged, presumably by Christians.
