= Kushite religion =

Religious beliefs of the Kushites

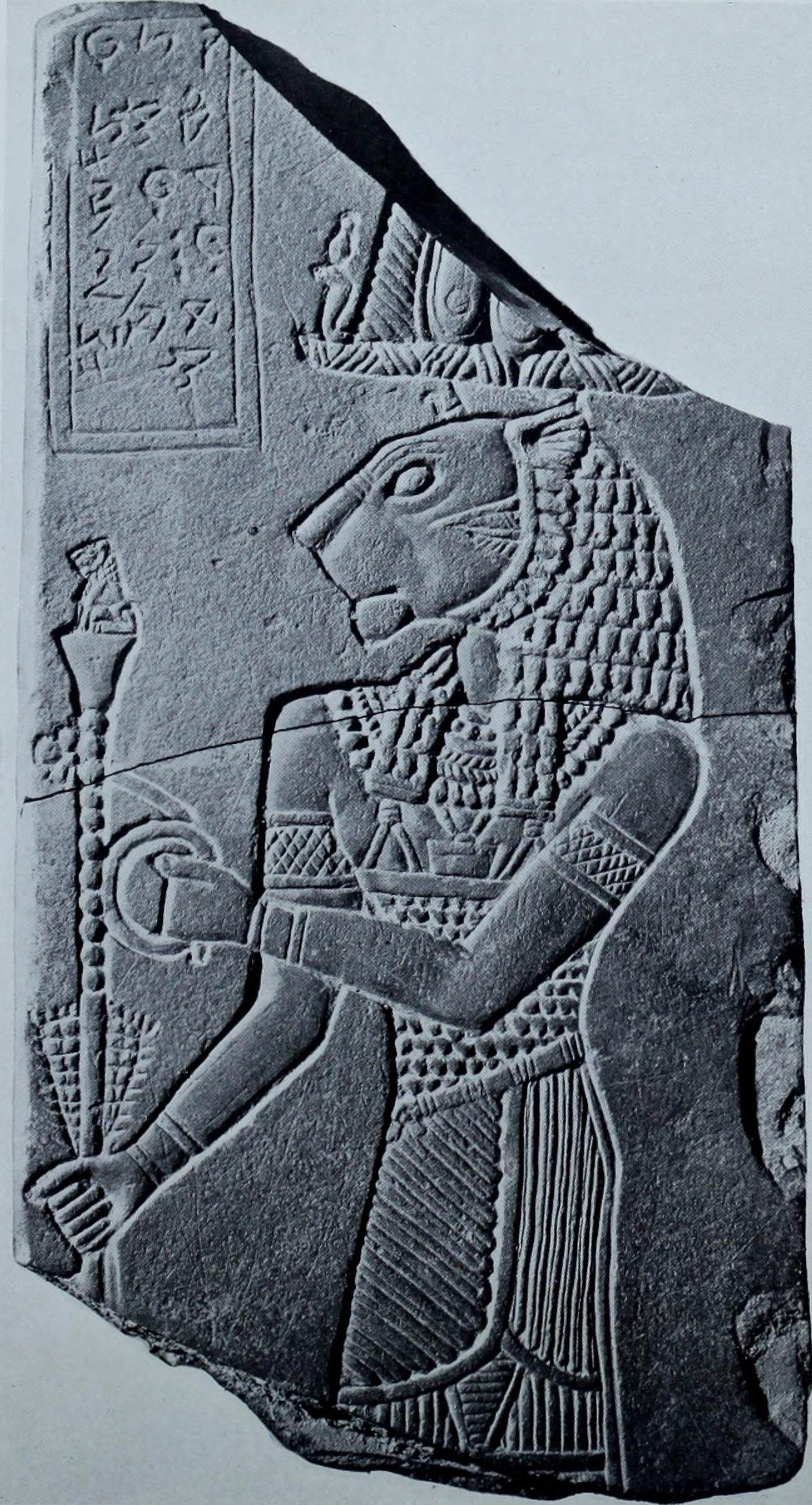
- Votive plaque of Apedemak, Naqa kiosk, excavation by John Garstang, 1909-1910, in the Temple of Apedemak, Meroe
- Type: Indigenous religion
- Orientation: Polytheistic (and animist during the Kerma culture)
- Region: Nubia (present-day Sudan)
- Headquarters: Kerma, later Meroe
- Territory: Nubia
- Defunct: mid-4th century AD

Kushite religion is the traditional belief system and pantheon of deities associated with the Ancient Kushites, who founded the Kingdom of Kush in the land of Nubia (also known as Ta-Seti) in present-day Sudan.

The core influence and recorded origins of Kushite religious practices can be traced back to the animistic Kerma culture where lions and other animals were depicted in their non-anthropomorphic animal forms, unlike the human-like gods in Ancient Egyptian religion and in later Napatan and Meroitic periods. Indigenous Nubian practices persisted into later periods despite the effects of New Kingdom Egyptian colonization and religious syncretism. Research also shows influences from the C-Group culture, A-Group culture, Pan-Grave culture, and Ancient Egyptian religion. By the First Intermediate Period, Nubians held greater control over their own territory and some integrated into Egyptian society. The founding of the Kingdom of Kush, with its capital at Kerma, marked a significant period where Nubians maintained their distinct religious practices, as seen in the elaborate burials of the Classic Kerma Period (ca. 1750-1450 BC).

In the New Kingdom Period, Nubia fell under Egyptian control, but later unified under leaders like King Alara and King Kashta, leading to the establishment of the Second Kingdom of Kush. This era saw the integration of Nubian and Egyptian deities. After the fall of the Twenty-fifth Dynasty of Egypt, in which Nubians ruled Egypt, Nubian religious practices persisted through various foreign dominions. During the Meroitic Period, the capital moved to Meroe, and the focus shifted to indigenous deities like Apedemak and Amesemi. The region's conversion to Christianity by the mid-4th century marked the end of traditional Kushite religion.

== History ==
Despite their close proximity to Ancient Egypt, a civilization that practiced what many historians consider one of the most extensive religious systems in the ancient world, Kushites possessed an intricately unique pantheon in their own right. Due to the lack of Nubian texts and artifacts prior to their interactions with Egyptians, much of early Nubian religion is still unclear. Fortunately, archeologists have uncovered many elements of their practices via the burials of A Group, Napata, C Group, Kerma and via writings after many Nubians adopted Egyptian hieroglyphs during the Napatan Period.

=== Pre-Kush culture ===
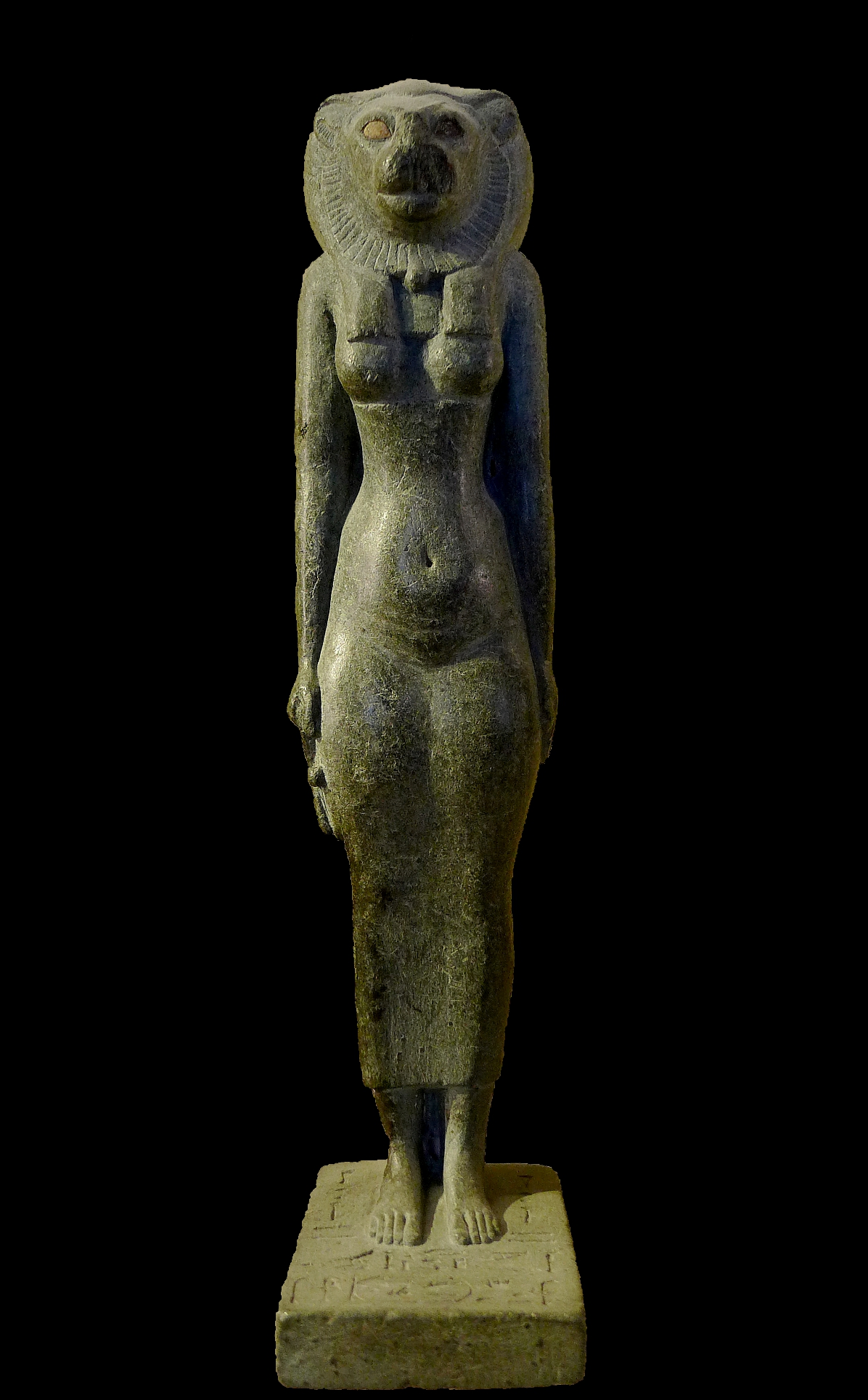
Statue of Bastet with a lion head

Excavations of early Nubian societies uncovered hints as to how their daily lives and their spiritual beliefs connected. The A Group Culture (ca. 3700-2800 BC) revealed the domestication of animals, agricultural cultivation, elaborate pottery that was polished red and black, and fine amulets, figurines and necklaces made of ivory. These goods were also found in burials at the Terminal A Group Cemetery L at Qustul and suggest that Nubians in Lower Nubia also had ritualistic practices that were independent of Ancient Egyptian religion. The materials that comprised the burial goods also revealed that Nubians traded regularly with Egypt and peoples in Western Asia, with Nubia acting as "a corridor to sub-Saharan Africa" and its exotic goods of ebony, giraffe tails, elephants, stones, ostrich eggs, etc. Archeologist Bruce Williams concluded that much of early Pre-Dynastic culture that's often attributed to Egypt is also Nubian in origin. He maintained that Nubia developed its own complex, dynastic culture that was not an imitation of Egypt and that both emerging kingdoms "belonged to the 'great East African substratum'."

During the Early Dynastic Period (ca. 3050-2685 BC) and the Old Kingdom Period (ca. 2685-2150 BC), Egypt's hunger to control Nubia and its lucrative trade routes and gold mines led to military campaigns into Nubia, increasing contact between the nations. The C Group Culture emerged circa 2300 BC. Archaeological digs revealed stone, circular graves "with the deceased in a flexed position surrounded by grave goods" in the early phase of the culture. By the next phase, burials had undergone a rapid "Egyptianization" with rectangular graves and Egyptian grave goods. Outside of C Group, the tomb biography about Pepy I by Weni the Elder revealed the names of six other Nubian kingdoms: Medja, Wawat, Yam, Irtjet and Setju.

By the First Intermediate Period (ca 2150-2008 BC) and early Middle Kingdom Period (ca 2009-1760 BC), Nubia had full control of its land and peace with Egypt. Nubians also lived and work in the lands of their neighbor. Some scholars believe there is even evidence that Nubians married their way into the Egyptian monarchy. Pharaoh Mentuhotep II and his queen consort, Kemsit, are said to have been of Nubian origin, due to his appointment of Nubian archers into the Egyptian army and depictions of her with a black or pink face. But it was Mentuhotep II who renewed Egypt's interest to control of Nubia. At the beginning of the Twelfth Dynasty, this was finally accomplished by Amenemhat I, who also may have been of Nubian ancestry.

=== The founding of Kush ===
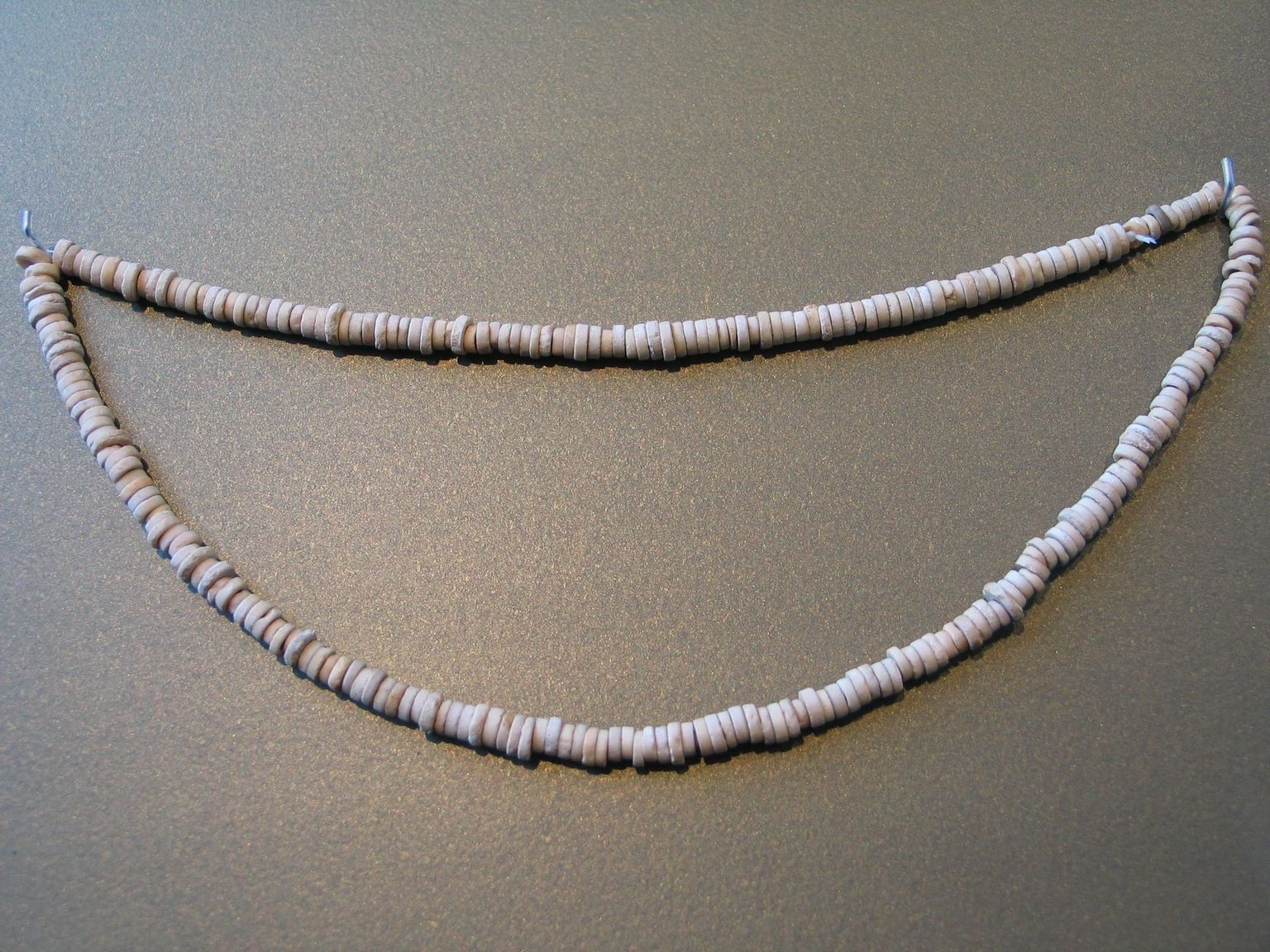
Shallow, round graves with concave bottoms were discovered in Upper Egypt and Lower Nubia. These so-called pan-graves often contain simple jewelry such as the necklaces displayed here, non-Egyptian pottery, and large numbers of weapons. The people buried in "pan graves" were probably the Medjayu, nomads from the eastern Nubian desert.

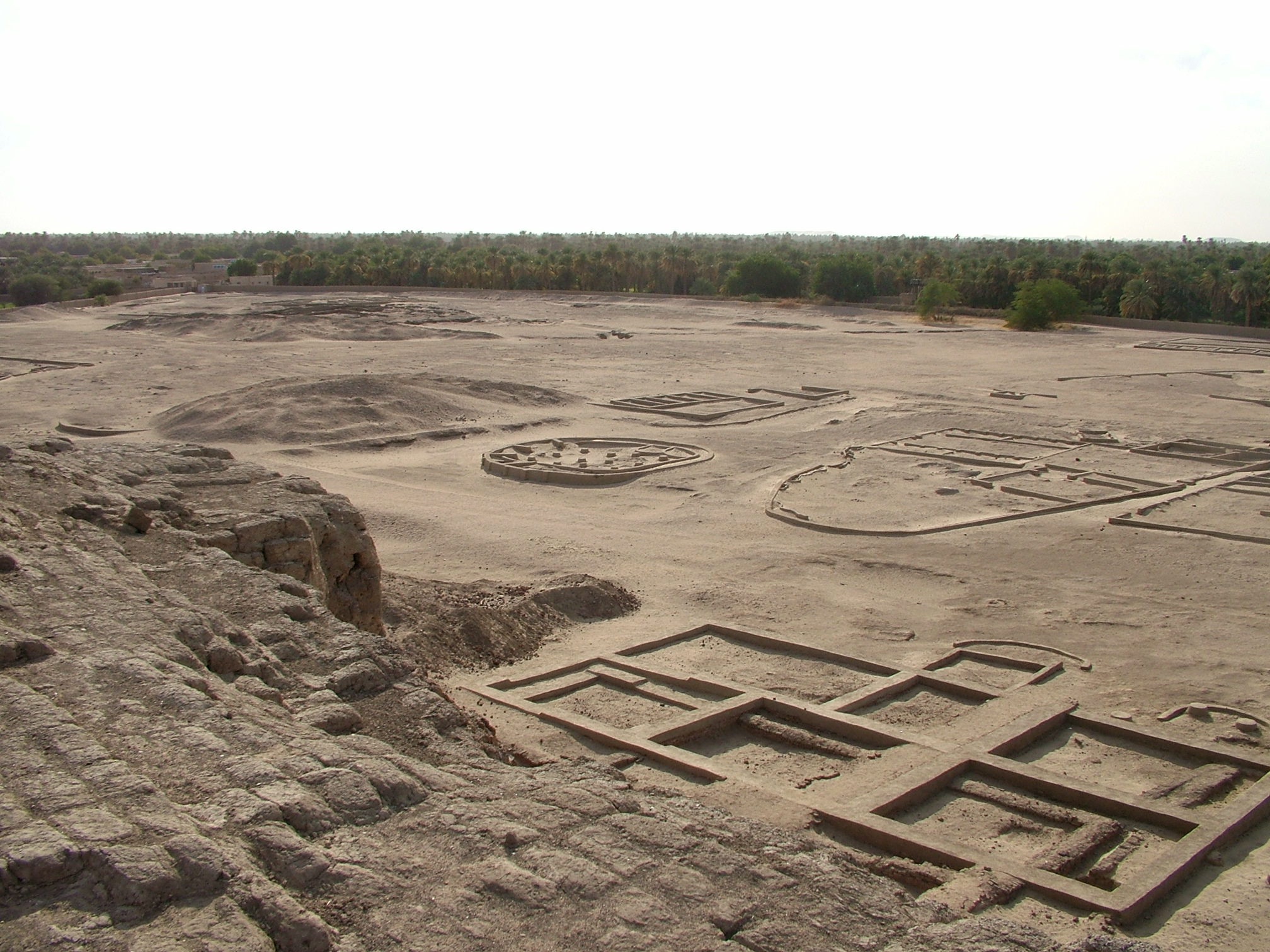
Excavations of the city of Kerma

The "First Kingdom of Kush," with its capital at Kerma, was first mentioned during the Twelfth Dynasty in Egyptian writings. However, it's still unclear if Kush was a centralized, dominant power that united Nubia or if there were small, independent polities across Nubia. While Egypt's control over Nubia continued into the Second Intermediate Period (ca. 1685-1550 BC), Kerman culture revealed the propagation of their indigenous, Nubian beliefs. From the Early Kerma Period (ca. 2500-2050 BC) to the Classic Kerma Period (ca 1750-1450), they solidified their burial practices. In Kerma, the deceased were buried in large, elaborate, round tumuli. They were laid on top of cowhides or beds and positioned on their sides "in a flexed position with their faces looking north, heads pointed east and feet west." They were also dressed in loincloths or wrapped in sheep skin, surrounded by grave goods of weapons, jewelry, mirrors, vessels of water, pottery, and other personal possessions. In Medja, the deceased were buried in "shallow, round graves," or pan graves, with grave goods that consisted of bow-and-arrows, cattle skulls, pottery, and jewelry.

During the New Kingdom Period (ca 1550-1077 BC), Ahmose I and Thutmose I relaunched campaigns in Nubia, which lasted for eighty-eight years. These battles are believed to have ended circa 1460 BC when Nubia once again fell completely under Egyptian control. Nubians launched a serious of rebellions to free themselves from Egypt with most of them failing. By the Third Intermediate Period (ca. 1076-723 BC), Napata was regarded as one of the most significant trade centers of the Old World, and Nubia was divided into independent cultures. King Alara (ca. 785-765 BC) united Nubia from Upper Nubia to the Third Cataract and formed the "Second Kingdom of Kush." King Kashta (ca. 765-753 BC) expanded the kingdom to include Lower Nubia and Thebes. Their conquests paved the way for King Piankhi (also called Piye) to conquer all of Egypt and found the Twenty-fifth Dynasty (ca. 722-655/53 BC), marking the beginning of the Late Period (ca. 722-332 BC). During this era, aspects of Nubian religion began to undergo another "Egyptianization." Pre-existing Nubian deities that were associated with Egyptian deities took on the names of their Egyptian counterparts but kept their Nubian characteristics, creating new iconography. The tomb of Alara (ca. early to mid-8th century BC) and other burials of the first Napatan Dynasty revealed a traditional Nubian royal burial with Egyptian elements.

Kendall noted that the occupant of Ku.9 (likely Alara):

"...was interred in the traditional Nubian manner, lying on a bed and placed in a small enclosed side-chamber at the bottom of a vertical shaft, the visible tomb superstructure incorporated many Egyptian features. The apex seems to have been adorned with a crudely cast, hollow bronze ba statue...The chapel had contained a plain, hard stone Egyptian-style offering table, and the chapel walls had been adorned with crude low relief. One block preserved what appeared to be the upper part of a male head, wearing a crown with a superstructure and streamers and a loop-like ornament over the brow, imitative of a uraeus..."

Egyptian deities also began to undergo a "Nubianization" in Egypt. Egyptians originally depicted Aman as a human-headed male, but by the New Kingdom both Egypt and Kush depicted him as a ram-headed male, a depiction very reminiscent of the indigenous Nubian ram-headed deities of water and fertility that were originally worshipped at Kerma. While it is well-documented that Nubians worshipped Egyptian gods, such as Aman (also called Amen and Gem Aten) and Isis, artifacts also revealed that Egyptians also worshipped Nubian deities, such as Dedwen (also called Dedun), Bes, Menhit and Mandulis (Melul in Meroitic). There are also deities that were "shared" at the border of Lower Nubia and Upper Egypt and considered to be both Nubian and Egyptian, such as Bastet, Satis and Anaka. Some historians suggested that Bastet has Nubian origins.

=== The fall of the 25th Dynasty of Egypt ===
Circa 655/53 BC, the Kingdom of Kush would lose their hold on territories north of Lower Nubia, marking the Twenty-fifth Dynasty as the last Kushite rulers of Egypt. Beginning in the Late Period, Kush and Egypt transitioned through centuries of diverse rulers, who assimilated Kushite/Egyptian culture and left traces of their own. The Neo-Assyrian Empire (ca. 671–663 BC) began conquest under Esarhaddon and eventually defeated Pharaoh Taharqa (690–664 BC) under Ashurbanipal. A conquered Egypt fell under the rule of Psamtik I. When his reign ended, Kushite influence over Egypt officially ended. During Assyrian rule, the sacking of Thebes resulted in the destruction of numerous temples that were devoted to Kushite and Egyptian deities. The remainder of Assyrian rule was marked by conquest wars against the Babylonians and Medes (ca. 626–609 BC). During this period, Egyptian royals once again gained control of the kingdom as the Assyrian Empire declined.

Egypt was later conquered by the Achaemenid (Persian) Empire (ca. 524–330 BC) under Cambyses II, who founded the Twenty-seventh Dynasty (ca. 525–404 BC). Under Persian rule, Cambyses II and Ochus (also called Artaxerxes III) persecuted followers of traditional Egyptian religion. Both were known to instruct their guards to plunder temples, pillage towns, steal religious text, and slaughter sacred animals. During the Hellenistic Greek Period, Egypt was conquered by the Macedonian Empire (ca. 332–323 BC) under Alexander the Great. Instead of positioning himself as a conqueror, Alexander proclaimed himself the "liberator" of Egypt. This implied that Greece was there to free the Egyptian people from the clutches of the old Egyptian pharaohs and pantheon. Further diminishing the role of Egyptian deities in governmental affairs, the cult of Alexander associated him with the Greek gods Zeus and Apollo rather than Amun and Ra. After Alexander's death, the Ptolemaic Dynasty (305–30 BC) won control of Egypt under Ptolemy I and his son Ptolemy II. The Greek pantheon continued to dominant Ptolemaic cults, with Ptolemy I and his dynasty being associated with them.

=== Kushite religion after the fall of Egypt ===
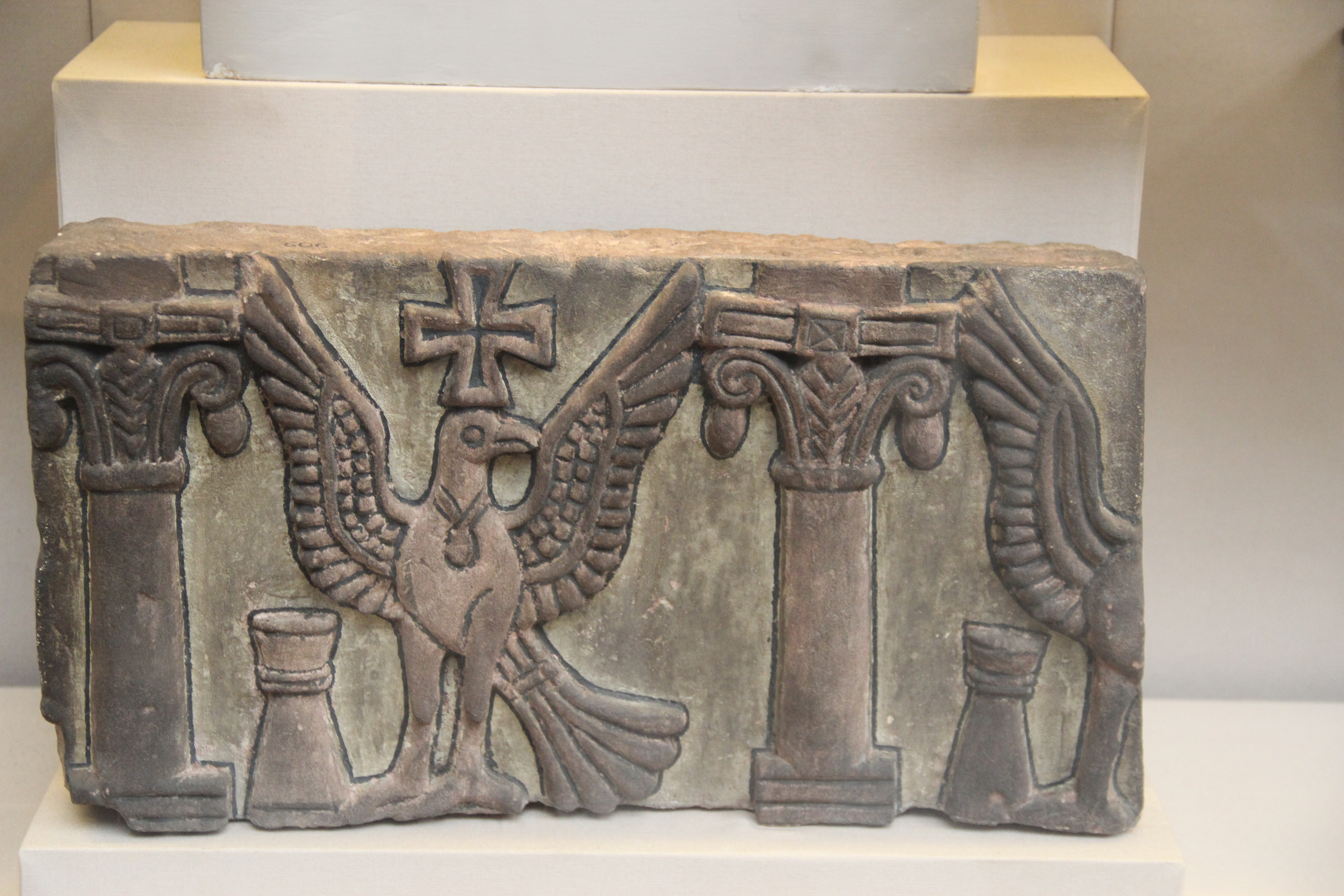
Bas-Relief, Christian Nubia, British Museum, Egypt and Nubia Gallery, London, England, UK. Complete indexed photo collection at WorldHistoryPics.com.

Farther south, Kush had entered its Meroitic Period (mid-3rd century BC -mid-4th century AD). The capital moved from Napata to Meroë in Upper Nubia. Away from the cults of traditional Egyptian religion, Meroitic Kushites created a new pantheon that centered Nubian deities and indigenous practices with little Egyptian influence. Apedemak, the lion protector god, and his consort, Amesemi, became the most prominent deities. Aman was depicted holding objects that were associated with Apedemak, such as sovereign arrows, emphasizing that Apedemak had more influence in Meroe. Nevertheless, Aman still maintained a presence as a representation of Nubian ram-headed gods, while Isis was absorbed and became a representation of traditional Nubian goddesses.

Kushite rulers also redirected their attention to protecting their borders from invaders. In 319 BC, Ptolemy I dispatched an army to attack Kush. In the 270s BC, Ptolemy II invaded Nubia and defeated the Kingdom of Kush, gaining access to Kushite territory and the control of lucrative gold deposits in a region known as Dodekasoinos. Trade managed to continue between Kushites and Egyptians as Kush continued to secure war elephants, which were important to the Ptolemies.

The Roman Empire (30 BC-641 AD) eventually conquered Egypt after Caesar Augustus defeated Mark Antony and Cleopatra VII. During Roman rule, there was an even greater religious and political shift away from traditional Egyptian practices in Egypt. Roman emperors maintained their original titles, ending the use of the pharaoh title and the ruler's historical connection to Egyptian and Kushite deities. Imperial cults were also created in Egypt to honor of Augustus, but he was identified with Zeus and other Olympian gods. In 25 BC, Amanirenas, a Kushite Kandake, commanded an army of about 30,000 Nubian warriors and was successful in preventing the expansion of the Roman Empire into Nubia. She was the first of a long line of Kandake who ruled and protected Kush. Despite the influences from the invaders of Egypt, Kushites continued to maintain cults for indigenous Nubian deities.

=== Christianity in Nubia ===
By the mid-4th century, the Kingdom of Kush had fallen. Nubians, without a functioning kingdom and possibly desperate to maintain what little control they had left over the ivory trade, attacked the Kingdom of Aksum. Under King Ezana, Aksum responded with a large military force and plundered Meroë circa 350 AD. In the 5th century, Nubia split into three new kingdoms: Nobatia (ca. 350-590 AD) with its capital at Faras, Makuria (ca. 5th century-1518) with its capital at Dongola, and Alodia (ca. 6th century–c. 1500) with its capital at Soba. Circa 580 AD, these kingdoms converted to Christianity with the Temple of Taharqa being renovated to include a church. Faras also became a religious center for Christian Nubian bishops. With the advent of Christianity, most temples dedicated to indigenous Kushite deities were replaced with churches and monasteries dedicated to Yahweh. Burial practices also changed from Kerman-style stone circles, Medjayu-style pan-graves and Meroitic-style tumuli with funerary goods to Christian-style rectangular graves with no funerary goods and a cross or small tombstone on top.

== Deities ==
| Aman | (also called Asha Renu, Amen, Amun and Gem Aten) He was a ram-headed god with wavy horns and curled horns who was depicted wearing a large sun-disc. His name translates to "the Sun Disc is Found." |
| Amanete | Named in an official's inscription from Karanog, more information has not been discovered about the deity. |
| Amesemi | The lunar, sky goddess of Meroë and consort of Apedemak, she was often depicted with a short, curly afro and a headdress topped with two falcons and a crescent moon. At the Temple of Aman in Naqa, her image was carved into a stele alongside Amanishakheto of Meroe and Apedemak. |
| Anhur | (also called Onuris) A hunting and war god who was the consort of Mehit or Atari when she was associated with Tefnut in the "Distant Goddess" motif during the Amarna Period. He is believed to be the god who hunted the Eye of Re in Nubia and her back to Re. |
| Anaka | (also called Anuket) A ram-headed goddess of divine protection that was associated with the water. She was also a part of a triad with Satis and Khnum. Collectively, they were seen as the source of Nile's yearly inundation. Her cult was at Kawa, where she appears as the consort of Aman and the associate of Satis. She forms with triad of Elephantine with Satis and Khenmu. |
| Apedemak | A war and protection lion god who was depicted with a lion head, often carrying large bows-and-arrows as he offered prisoners and dhurra (millet) to the ruling qore (king). The crops are evidence that he also has lunar aspects. He is also depicted walking elephants and lions on leashes. |
| Aqedise | A lunar god who was considered the Nubian equivalent of Khonsu. |
| Arensnuphis | (possibly called Tabo) A war and hunter lion-head god of the desert who was often paired with Sabomakal. Their images were often positioned over the entrances of temples, emphasizing their roles as guardians. In human form, he also "wore a short kilt, a tall feather crown and divine beard." Originally of Nubia, he had a temple at Philae and was associated with Dedwen, Isis and Anhur. |
| Ariten | Named in an official's inscription from Karanog, more information has not been discovered about the deity. |
| Atari | (also called Hathor in Egypt) The "Mistress of God" goddess of the sky, sun, and femininity, she is often depicted as a cow, symbolizing her maternal and celestial aspect. Her most common form was that of a woman wearing a headdress of cow horns and a sun disk. She could also be represented as a lioness, a cobra, or a sycamore tree. |
| Bastet | A cat goddess, she was originally depicted as a lion goddess of fertility and protection. Her eminence in Nubia far exceeded that in Egypt, suggesting that she possibly had a Nubian origin or an indigenous Nubian equivalent. The Temple of Bastet at Tare (also called Per-Bast) was often visited by newly-crowned rulers, and amulets with her depiction were also found in the burials of Nubian royals, revealing her importance to the protection of the monarchy. |
| Bes | A god associated with protection of Nubian women during childbirth, his image was found in a mammisi, or divine birth temple. His eminence in Kush far exceeded that in Egypt, suggesting that he possibly had a Nubian origin or an indigenous Nubian equivalent. His Egyptian titles "Lord of Punt" and "Ruler of Nubia" also emphasize a beginning in Nubia. He was also depicted with Atari, who is also associated with childbirth. |
| Breith | The "divine brother" of Merul, he is depicted with a falcon body and a human head. More information has not been discovered about him. |
| Dedun | (also called Dedwen) Depicted as a lion protector god, he was first mentioned in Egyptian Pyramid Texts as a Nubian god of incense, who burned incense at the birth of royals. Due to his use of incense, he was also associated with fortune, prosperity and wealth. The Temple of Osiris-Dedwen (B 700) at Jebel Barkal, constructed at the request of Atlanersa, revealed that Aman-Re transformed into Osiris-Dedwen. He subsequently became associated with the protection of deceased Nubian royals. |
| Khenmu | (also called Khnum) The ram-headed god of virility and fertility was originally the Nubian god who fashioned human beings from the clay and then placed them in the womb of their mothers to be born into the earth. He forms with triad of Elephantine with Anaka and Satis. |
| Makedeke | Named in an official's inscription from Karanog, more information has not been discovered about the deity. |
| Mash | Named in an official's inscription at their temple at Karanog, more information has not been discovered about the deity. |
| Mehit | The lunar lion goddess during the Early Dynastic Period (31250-2613 BC) in Nubia and consort of Anhur, she is often depicted as a reclining lioness with three sticks jutting out from behind her. She is also identified as the "Distant Goddess." |
| Menhit | The solar and protective goddess of Nubian origin is often depicted as a reclining lioness. In one version of the "Distant Goddess" motif, the Eye of Re is said to become Menhit from another deity. |
| Melul | (also called Mandulis in Greek) The "divine brother" of Breith, the sun god who was depicted as god with a falcon body and a human head. He re-emerged during the Roman Period, where he appeared in the gateway at the Temple of Dendur with Emperor Augustus presenting he and Arensnuphis with offerings. The Temple of Kalabsha was also dedicated to him. There, he is also depicted as a juvenile with lunar qualities, "wearing the full moon, the crescent over a skull-cap and the side-lock of hair like god Khonsu the Child." |
| Miket | (also called Mekhit) The Meroitic lion goddess of war of Nubian origin was often associated with the moon and is often depicted as a roaring lionness. Some sources identify her as the subject of the "Distant Goddess" motif, instead of Mehit. In one legend, the Eye of Ra flees from Egypt. Her counterpart, Ra, sends another god to track her down in Nubia, where she transforms into a lioness. When she is returned to Ra, she either becomes or gives birth to Menhit. Afterwards, she's said to have become the consort of Anhur. |
| Sabomakal | (also called Sebiumeker) The Meroitic lion protector god possibly had origins as a supreme god in pre-dynastic Nubia, where he was associated with procreation and fertility. He later became a war and hunter lion-head god of the desert who was often paired with Arensnuphis. Their images were often positioned over the entrances of temples, emphasizing their roles as guardians. In human form, he was also depicted "wearing a short kilt, the double crown of Egypt, and the divine beard." |
| Satis | A ram-headed goddess of divine protection that was associated with the water. She was also depicted as a woman wearing the White Crown of Upper Egypt with antelope horns. She was also reverenced as a war, hunting and fertility goddess. Her first temple was built during the Naqada III period at Elephantine, where she was linked to the inundation of the Nile. She was also a part of the Elephantine triad with Anaka and Khenmu. During the Middle Kingdom, Mentuhotep II also constructed a temple in her honor. She is associated with the Eye of Ra and "Distant Goddess" motif. |
| Wusa | (also called Isis) The "Mistress of Kush" and "Mistress of Heaven, Earth, and the Underworld," she was an all-embracing mother and protector goddess. She was absorbed into the image of indigenous, Nubian mother goddesses and became a representation of the Queen Mothers and Kandakes of Kush. Her Nubian cult was centered at Philae, but she also had temples located throughout the kingdom. She was also referred to as Weret-Hekau, which translates to "The Great Magic" and was associated with Nubian oracles and magic. As part of indigenous Nubian custom, Kushites took pilgrimages to her Temple at Philae. |
