= Dedun =

Ancient Nubian deity

- God of incense, wealth, and prosperity
- Dedun in his few depictions such as the temple of Thutmose III in Semna was depicted with generic iconography similar to how Atum was sometimes depicted
Name in hieroglyphs
d d M42 n G7
- Venerated in: Nubian mythology
- Major cult center: Napata
- Symbol: Incense

Dedun (or Dedwen) was a Kushite or Nehasi (C-Group culture) god worshipped during ancient times in ancient Egypt and Sudan and attested as early as 2400 BCE. There is much uncertainty about their original nature, especially since he was depicted as a lion, a role that usually was assigned to the son of another deity. Additionally, nothing is known of the earlier Kushite mythology from which the deity arose. The earliest known information in Egyptian writings about Dedun indicates that he already had become a god of incense by the time of the writings. Since at that historical point, incense was an extremely expensive luxury commodity, and Nubia was the source of much of it, he was quite an important deity. The wealth that the trade in incense delivered to Nubia led to his being identified by them as the god of prosperity and of wealth in particular.

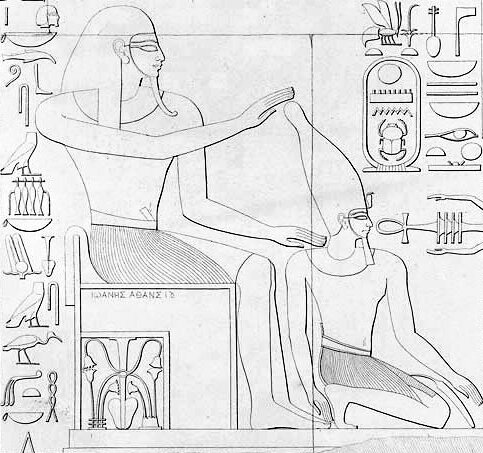
Dedun (left) crowning Thutmose III (kneeling). Relief from the temple of Thutmose III in Semna

Although he is mentioned in the Pyramid Texts of ancient Egypt as being a Nubian deity, there is no evidence that Dedun was worshipped by the Egyptians or that he was worshipped in any location north of Swenet (contemporary Aswan), which was considered the most southerly city of Ancient Egypt. Nevertheless, in the Middle Kingdom of Egypt, during the Egyptian rule over Kush, Dedun was said by the Egyptians to be the protector of deceased Nubian rulers and their god of incense, thereby associated with funerary rites.

Atlanersa, a Kushite ruler of the Napatan kingdom of Nubia, is known to have started a temple dedicated to the syncretic god Osiris-Dedun at Jebel Barkal.
