= Arensnuphis =

Ancient Nubian deity

- image of Arensnuphis based on ancient depictions
Name in hieroglyphs
i r Z4 A48 N41 z A1 nfr f r
or
i r Hm s nfr A48
- Venerated in: Nubian mythology
- Symbols: Lion, Spear
- Region: Kingdom of Kush
- Consort: Isis

Equivalents
- Egyptian: Anhur, Shu
- Greek: Ares
- Roman: Mars

Arensnuphis (in Egyptian: Iryhemesnefer, ỉrỉ-ḥms-nfr, "the good companion") is a deity from the Kingdom of Kush, first attested at Musawwarat el-Sufra in the 3rd century BC. His worship spread to the Egyptian-controlled portion of Kush in the Ptolemaic Period (305–30 BC). His mythological role is unknown; he was depicted as a lion and as a human with a crown of feathers and sometimes a spear.

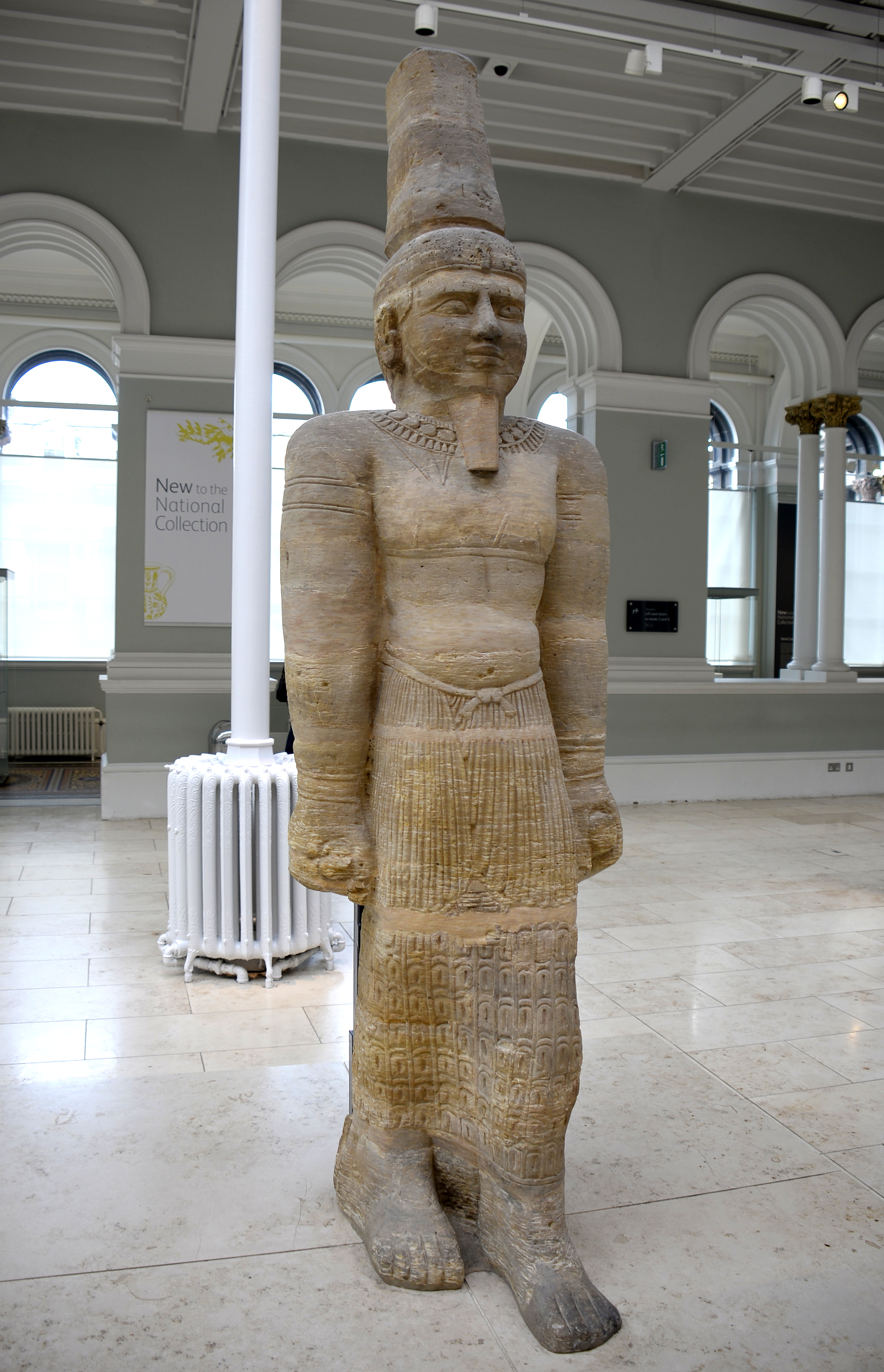
Temple statue of god Arensnuphis, from Meroe, Nubia (modern-day Sudan), 100-50 BCE. National Museum of Scotland, Edinburgh

Arensnuphis was worshipped at Philae, where he was called the "companion" of the Egyptian goddess Isis, as well as at Dendur. In the ancient Egyptian religion, the Egyptians syncretized him with their gods Anhur and Shu.
