= National Museum of Sudan =

Museum for the history of Sudan

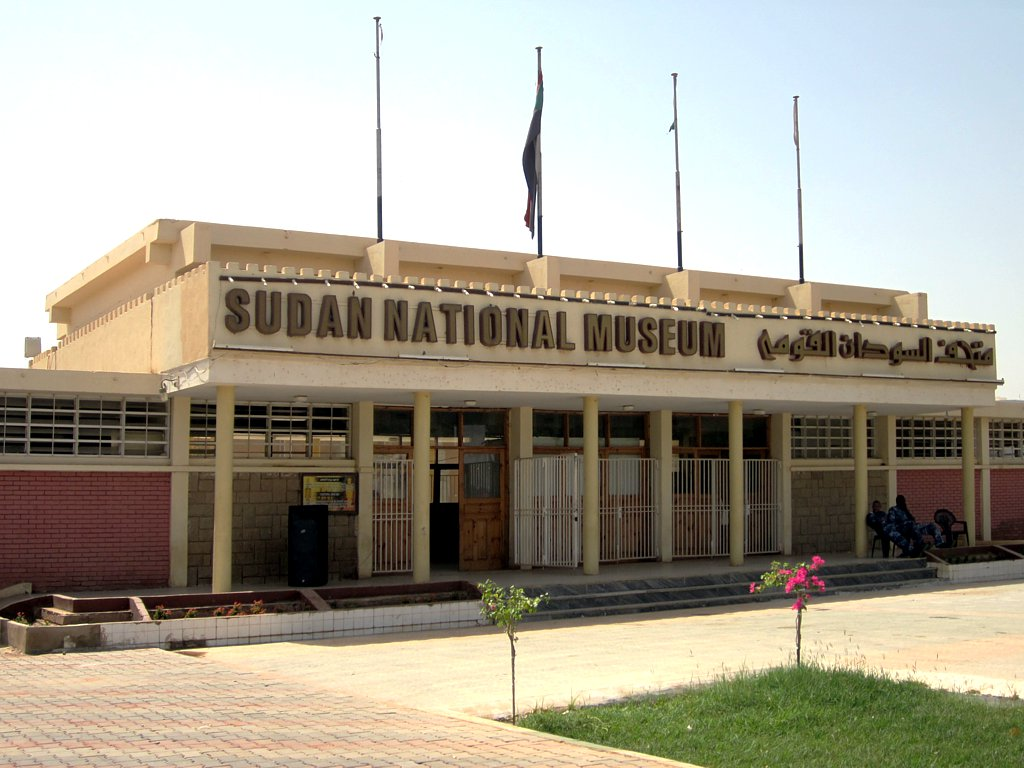
- Main entrance of the National Museum of Sudan

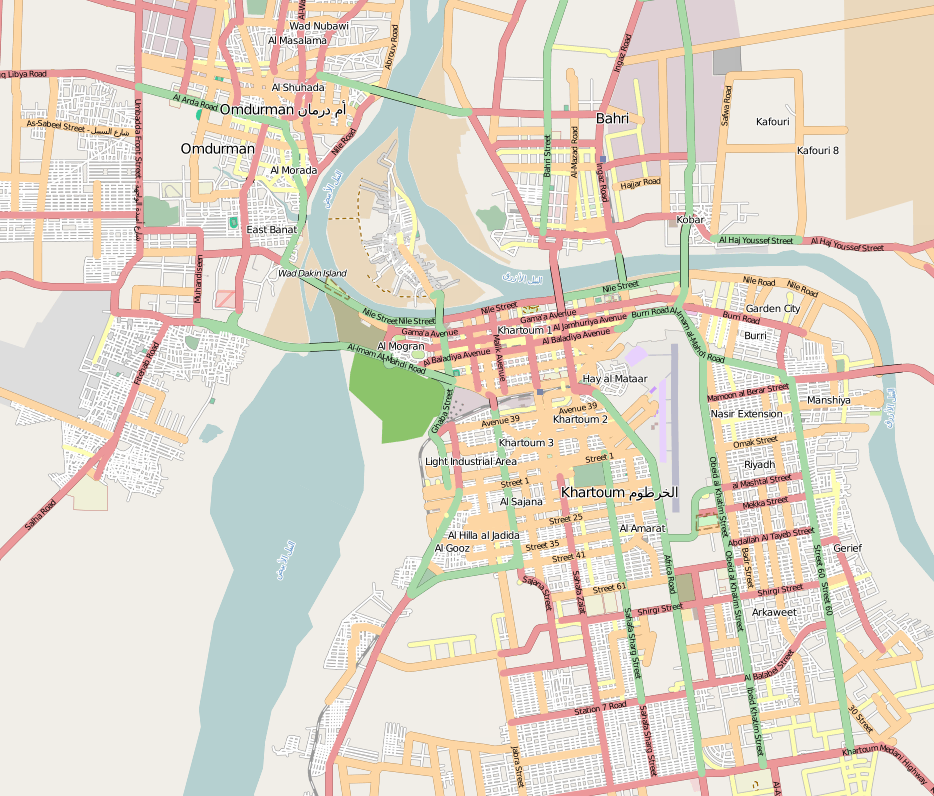
- Location of the National Museum in Khartoum, Sudan National Museum of Sudan (Sudan)
- Established: 1971
- Location: El Neel Avenue, Khartoum, Sudan
- Coordinates: 15.606°N 32.508°E
- Type: Archaeological collection of different epochs of Ancient Sudan and Ancient Egypt
- Director: Ghalia Garelnabi (acting)
- Website: Sudan National Museum

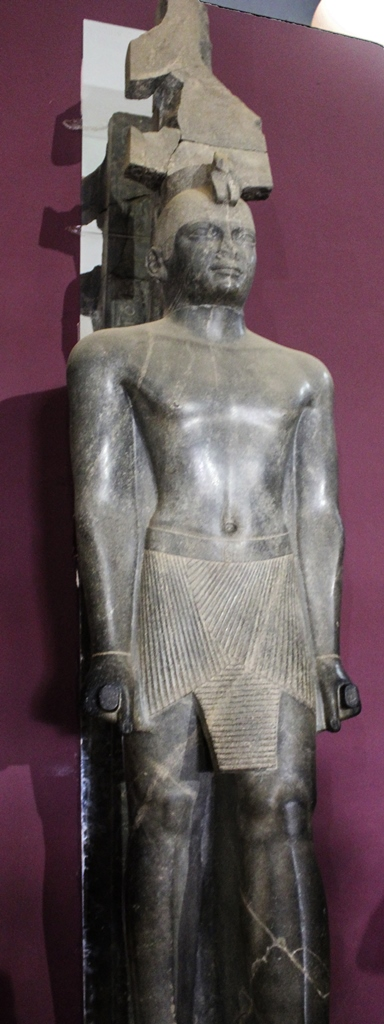
Statue of Pharaoh Taharqa.

The National Museum of Sudan or Sudan National Museum, abbreviated SNM, is a war-damaged former museum, housed in a two-story building, constructed in 1955 and established as national museum in 1971. Before its destruction during the Sudanese civil war, the museum held an estimated 100,000 objects covering thousands of years of Sudan's history, ranging from the Nubian kingdoms and the Kushite empire to the country's Christian and Islamic periods.

== History ==
Before the Sudanese civil war that started in April 2023, the museum building and its surrounding gardens housed the largest and most comprehensive Nubian archaeological collection in the world, including objects from the Paleolithic through to the Islamic period, originating from every site of importance in Sudan. A significant catalyst for the museum's creation was the large number of relocated artefacts as a result of the 1960–1980 International Campaign to Save the Monuments of Nubia.

In particular, the museum comprised collections of the following periods of the history of Sudan: Paleolithic, Mesolithic, Neolithic, A-Group culture, C-Group culture, Kerma Culture, Middle Kingdom of Egypt, New Kingdom of Egypt, Napata, Meroë, X-Group culture and medieval Makuria. The museum is located on Nile Avenue in Khartoum's al-Mugran area, close to the confluence of the White and the Blue Nile.

== Destruction during the civil war ==
The National Museum was the scene of heavy fighting during the Sudanese civil war (2023–present) between the Sudanese Armed Forces (SAF) and the paramilitary Rapid Support Forces (RSF). On 2 June 2023, the museum was taken over by the RSF. Most exhibits, among them ancient mummies dating back to 2500 BC, which are among the oldest and most archaeologically significant in the world, were destroyed, looted or badly damaged by the RSF.

The Continent magazine commented these events as follows: "The war in Sudan is destroying not just the country's future, but also the country's past." Reports later emerged that most items from the museum's collection had been looted and some taken to be sold in South Sudan. Ikhlas Abdel Latif, the head of museums at Sudan’s National Corporation for Antiquities and Museums (NCAM), said that items stored in the museum had been taken by truck to western Sudan and border areas.

Following the expulsion of the RSF from Khartoum in March 2025, the director of NCAM, Ghalia Garelnabi, accused the RSF of destroying 90% of the museum's holdings, looting its archaeological gold collection and deliberately smashing other artifacts. Almost all of the 100,000 objects from the museum's collection were looted according to The Guardian, with only very heavy artefacts such as monumental statues and rebuilt temples remaining. Following this, the French Archaeological Unit for Sudanese Antiquities (SFDAS), supported by the Louvre and Durham University, helped the museum create a virtual site to display lost artefacts and recreate its exhibits.

== Collection ==
The objects of the museum were displayed in four areas:

- The Main Hall on the ground floor
- The gallery on the first floor
- The Open Air Museum in the garden
- The Monumental Alley outside the museum building

=== The ground floor ===
Highlights of the collections included:

- The Taharqa statue. A 4-meter high granite statue of Pharaoh Taharqa, penultimate Pharaoh of the 25th Egyptian dynasty, facing the main entrance, welcomes the visitors to the museum. The statue was broken by the Egyptians when they sacked Napata in 591 BCE under the reign of Psamtik II, then buried in a pit by Kushite priests and excavated by George Reisner in 1916.
- Neolithic black-topped red burnished pottery and ram statuettes of the C-Group culture.
- Funerary artefacts and ceramic art dating from the Neolithic, A-group, C-Group, Kerma, and Kushite periods.
- Stela of the chief of Teh-khet Amenemhat, found at Debeira West
- Middle Kingdom of Egypt and New Kingdom of Egypt artefacts from the area of the third cataract like Sai, Soleb, Sedeinga and Kawa.
- A bowlegged figurine of the dwarf goddess Beset with a plump body and strange facial features: She has a large flat nose and a wide mouth framed by a lion mane and round lion ears. Uncommon in Egyptian art, Beset is pictured frontally and full-faced rather than in profile. She appears grasping an undulating snake in her 3-digit left hand indicating to control hostile forces. She is the protector of mothers and new-born children.
- The Napata and Meroë periods of the Kingdom of Kush including the 25th Pharaonic dynasty: Funerary material, a granite statue of king Aspelta, the statue of an unknown Meroitic king, represented as an archer, and artefacts from representative sites like Meroe, Musawwarat es-Sufra and Naqa.
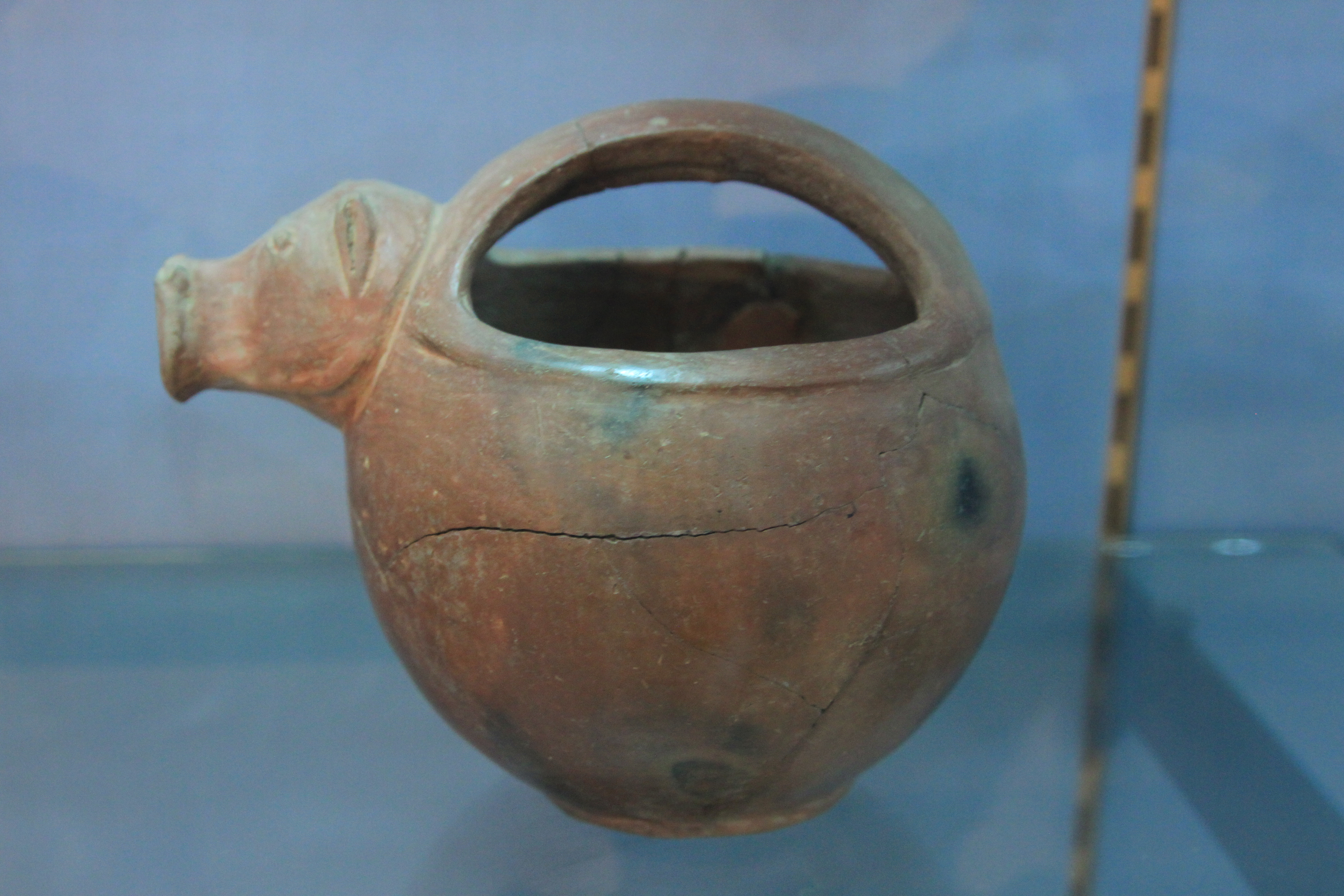
Kerma Culture jug with a beak in the shape of a hippopotamus head

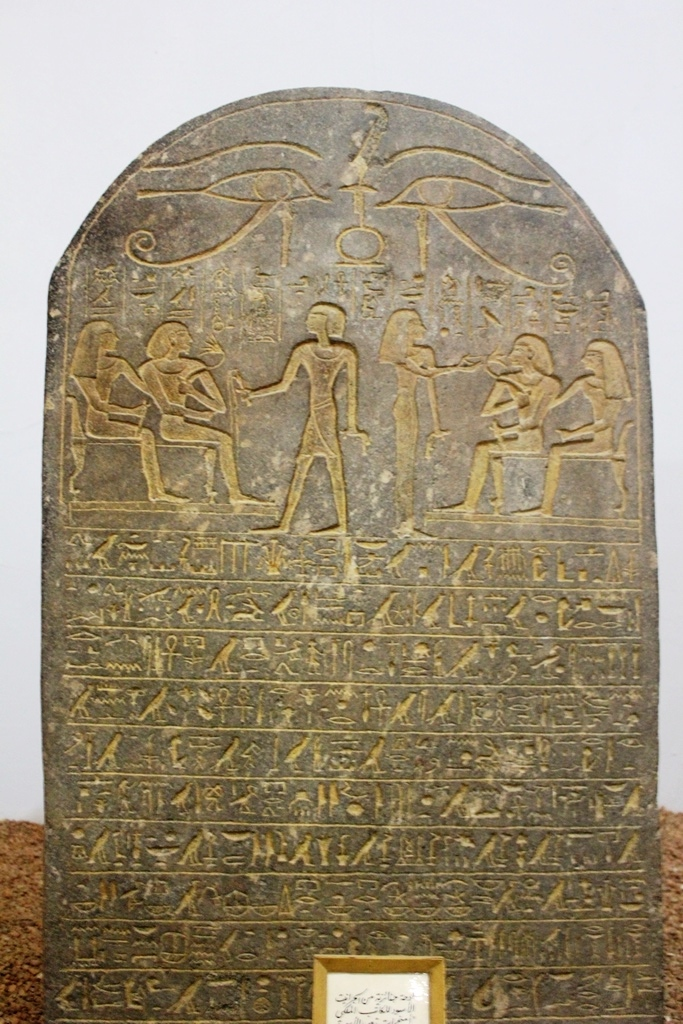
Stela of the chief of Teh-khet, Amenemhat

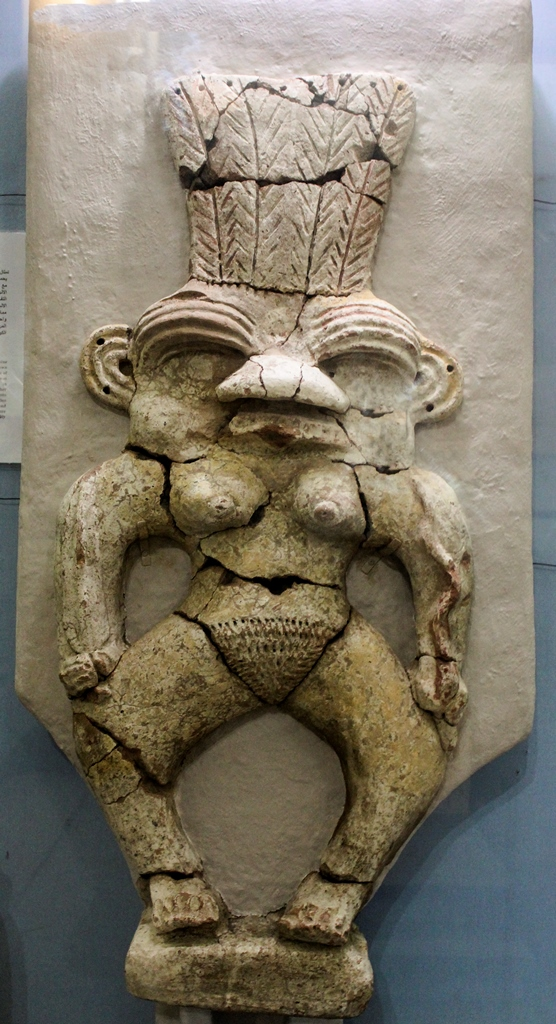
Female Demon Beset

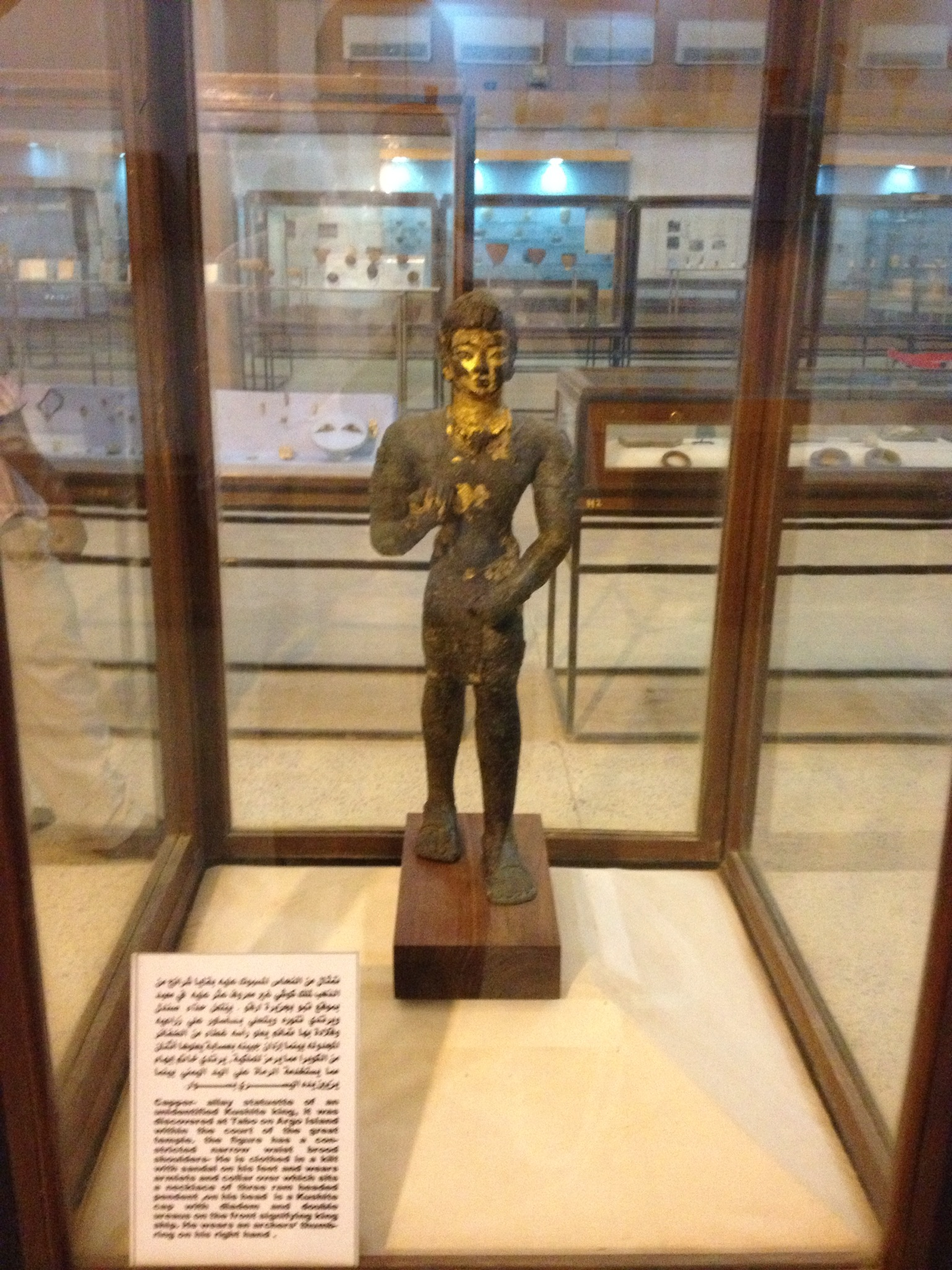
Bronze with gold statue of a Meroitic king as an archer

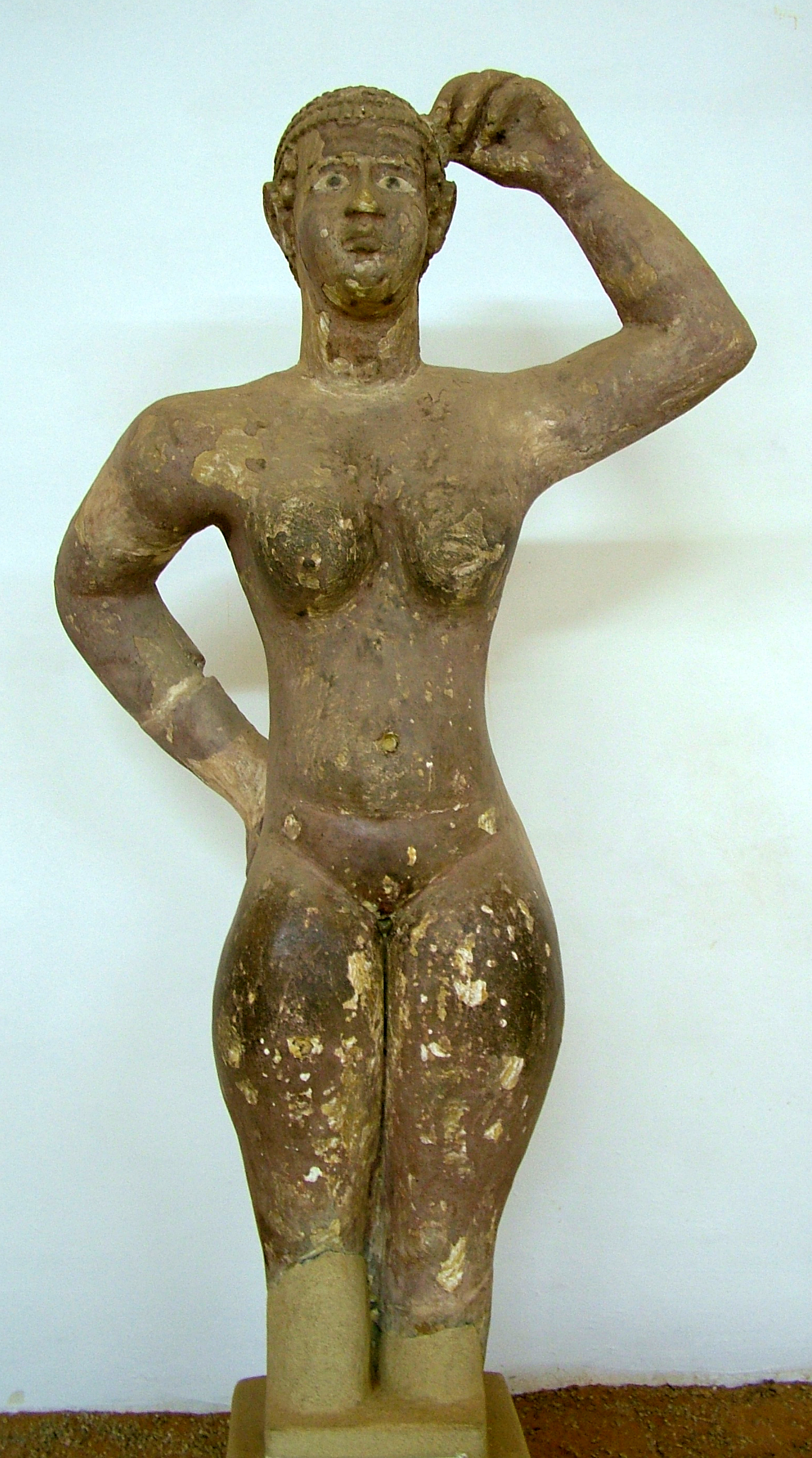
Beginning of CE sandstone-carved Meroitic statue raising its left arm

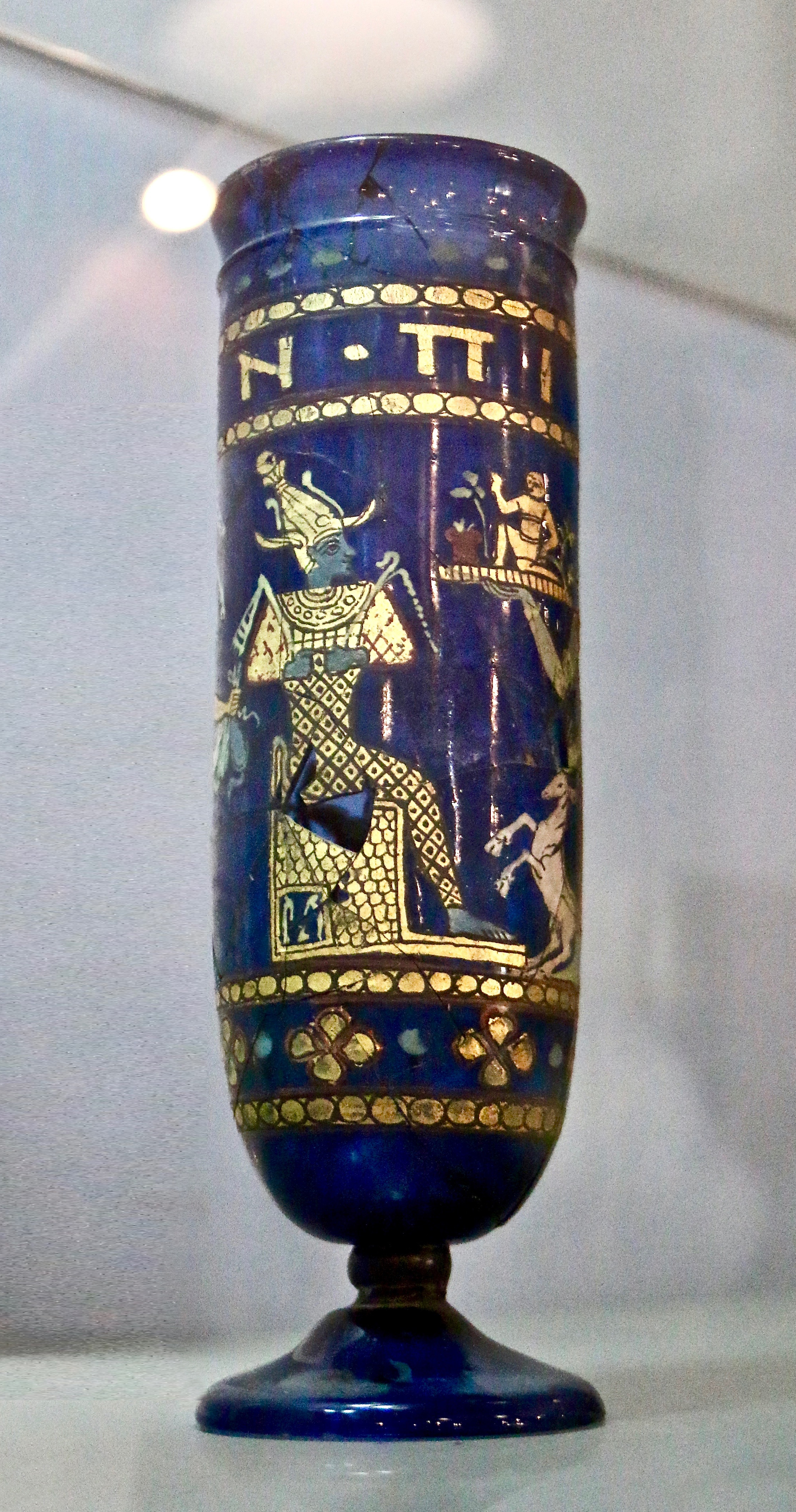
Chalice from the Napatan-Meroitic necropolis at Sedeinga, National Museum of Sudan

=== The first floor ===
- Wall paintings from the Christian Faras Cathedral dated between the 9th and the 13th century, detached during the UNESCO Salvage Campaign.
- The catalogue of Greek and Coptic inscriptions, produced primarily by the Christian culture of Nubia, was the scholarly contribution of Adam Lajtar from Warsaw University with respect to Greek inscriptions and Jacques Van der Vliet of Leiden University with respect to Coptic inscriptions. These inscriptions were found on Nubian funerary epitaphs in the Nubian territory in Sudan between Faras in the North and Soba in the South. The texts were inscribed in sandstone, marble or terracotta (36 inscriptions, mostly from Makuria) of generally rectangular shape.
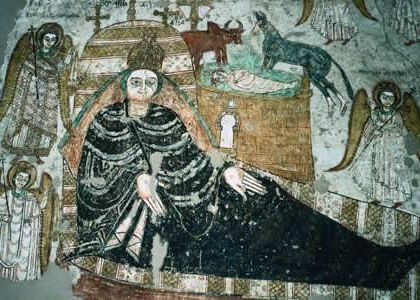
Fresco of Faras cathedral depicting the birth of Jesus.

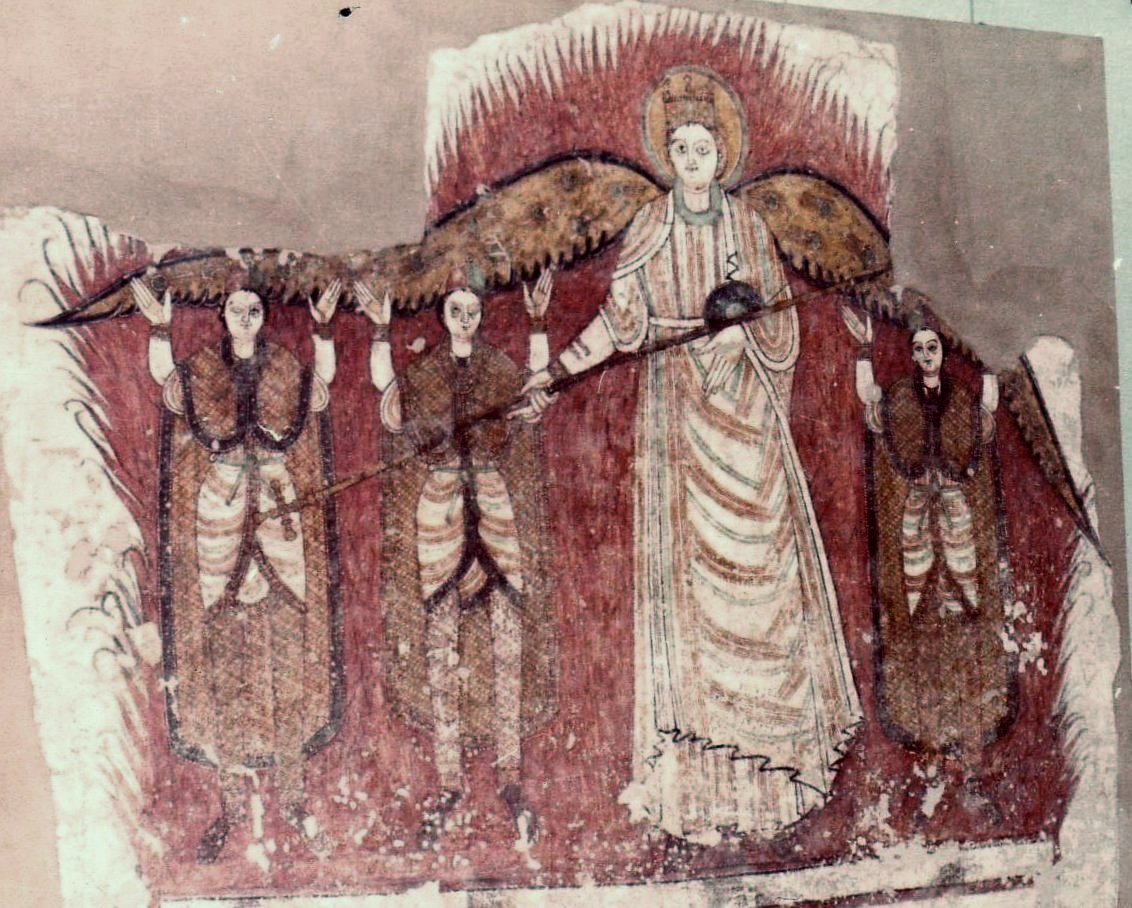
The story from Daniel and of the three youths thrown into the furnace.

=== The museum garden ===
==== Relocated temples ====
In the museum garden were some rebuilt temples and tombs relocated from the submerged area of Lake Nasser.

In 1964, the Aswan High Dam, built across the Nile River in Egypt, created a reservoir in the Nubian area, which extended into Sudan's territory threatening to submerge the ancient temples. During the UNESCO Salvage Campaign the following temples and tombs were re-erected in the museum garden according to the same orientation of their original location, surrounded by an artificial stream of water symbolic of the Nile:

- Some remains of the temple of Ramses II of Aksha dedicated to Amun and to Ramses II himself. Preserved are a part of the Pylon with the Pharaoh worshipping the dynastic god Amun and some side-elements detailing submitted peoples.
- The temple of Hatshepsut of Buhen dedicated to Horus. The falcon-headed Horus, the mythical ancestor of all Pharaohs, and Hatshepsut appearing as a king, never as a woman.
- The temple of Kumma dedicated to the ram-headed Khnum, the god of the Nile cataracts.
- The tomb of the Nubian prince Djehuti-hotep at Debeira
- The temple of Semna dedicated to Dedwen and the deified Sesostris III. The sunk reliefs of this temple were carved over a large period hence the scenes are fragmented.
- The granite columns from the Faras Cathedral
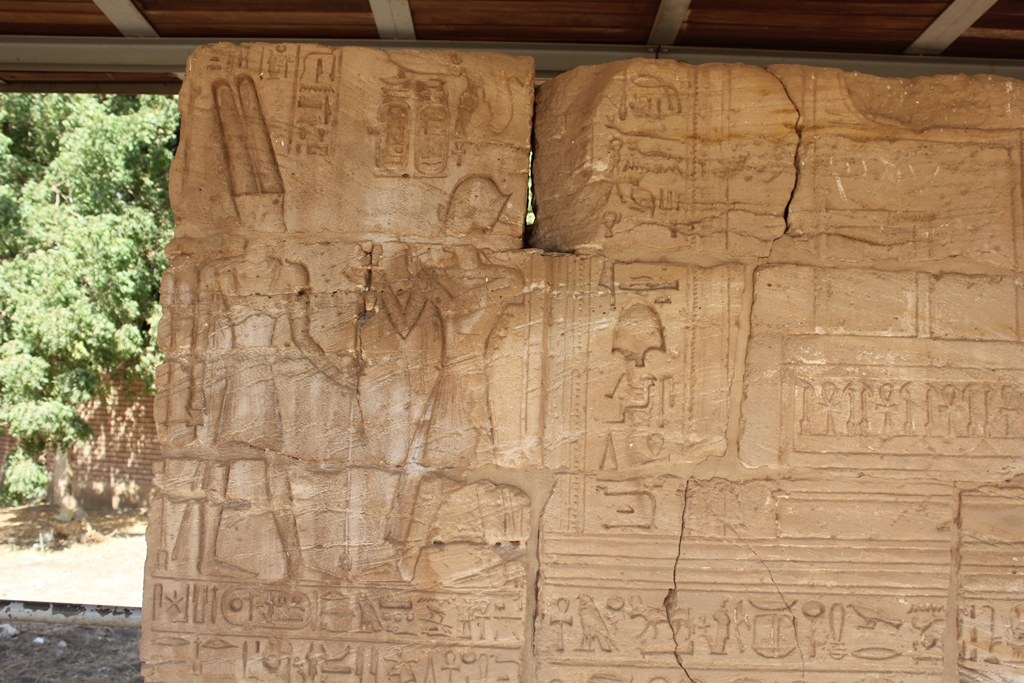
The temple of Aksha:The Pharao worshipping Amun

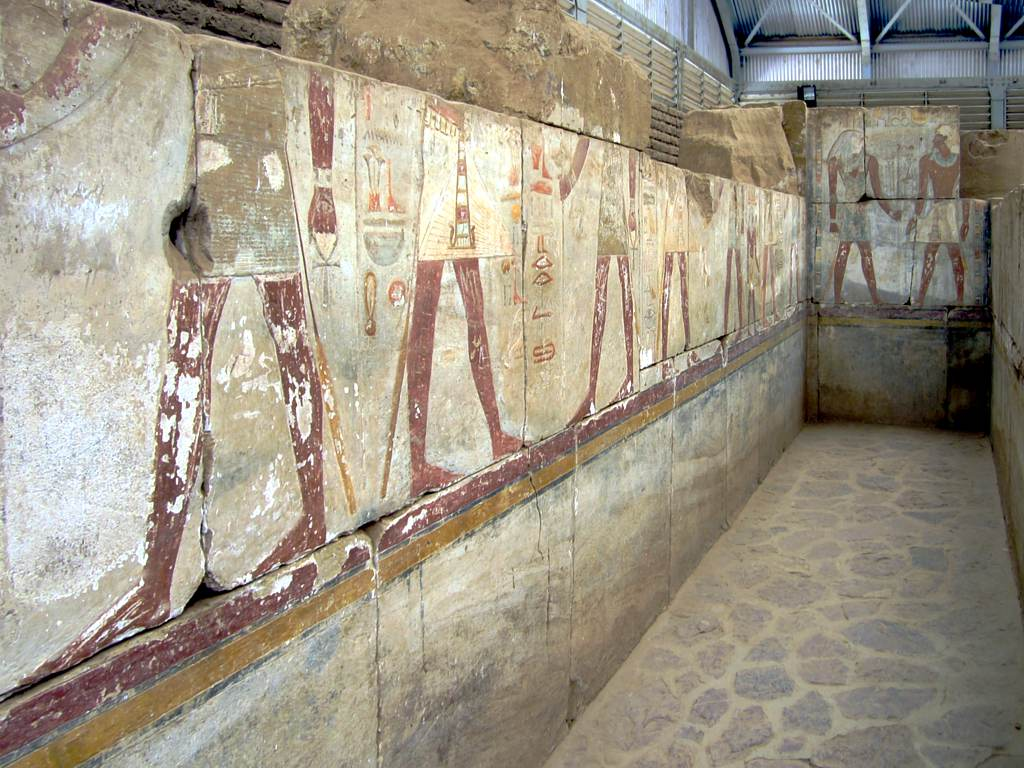
The Buhen temple (reign of Hatshepsut)

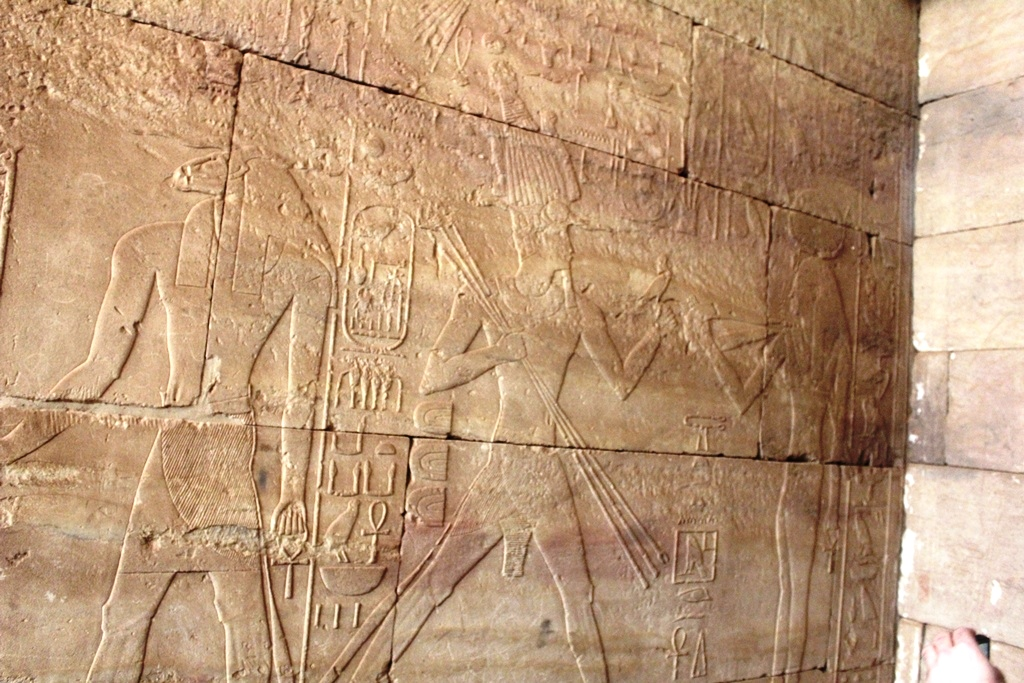
Temple of Kumma: The ram-headed Khnum (left) and Tuthmosis III (center) running towards Hathor (right) offering her a lapwing

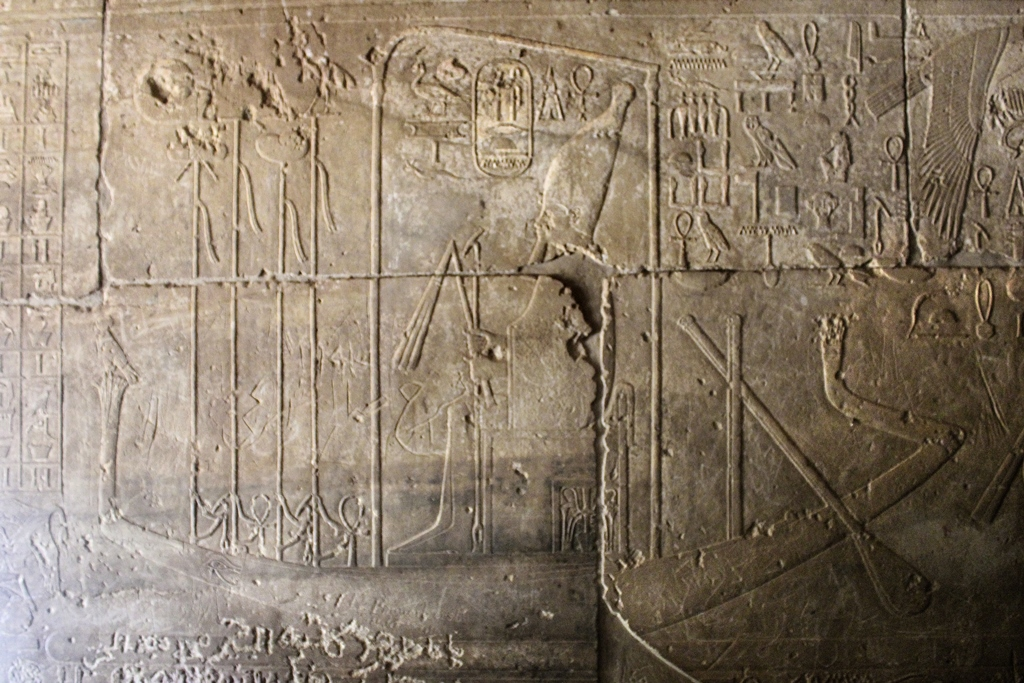
Temple of Semna: A New Kingdom graving shows an effigy of Sesostris III on a bark

==== Inscribed rocks ====
- Fragments of inscriptions of the submerged Nile-areas inserted onto fake rocks included a Nilometer with the name of queen Sobekneferu.
- At the banks of the water strip two Meroitic frog statues 60 cm in height from Basa village representing the water-goddess Heket, as well as Beset the protector of pregnant women and newborn babies.

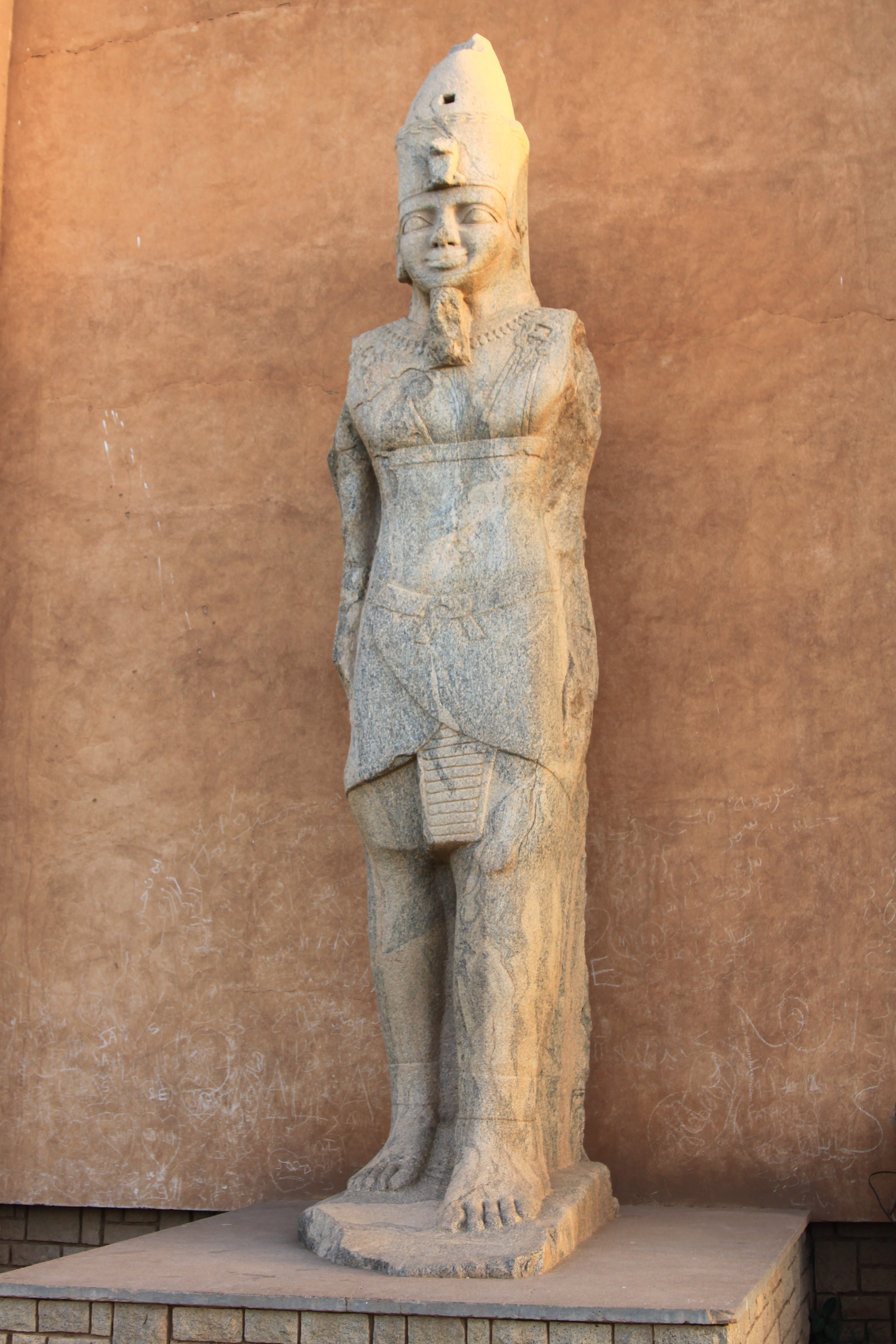
A Tabo coloss

==== The Tabo colossal statues ====
Outside the museum building were set up two granite unfinished colossal statues from the ancient temple of Tabo on Argo Island. As inscriptions were missing, they could not be assigned to any precise origin, but show Roman stylistic influence.

=== The Monumental Alley ===
The lane leading from the museum car park to the exhibition halls was flanked with Meroitic statues of two rams and six dark sandstone man-eating lions from Basa village site. The lions were from the first century BCE, as shown by the two cartouches from king Amanikhabale engraved on the first lion on the right.

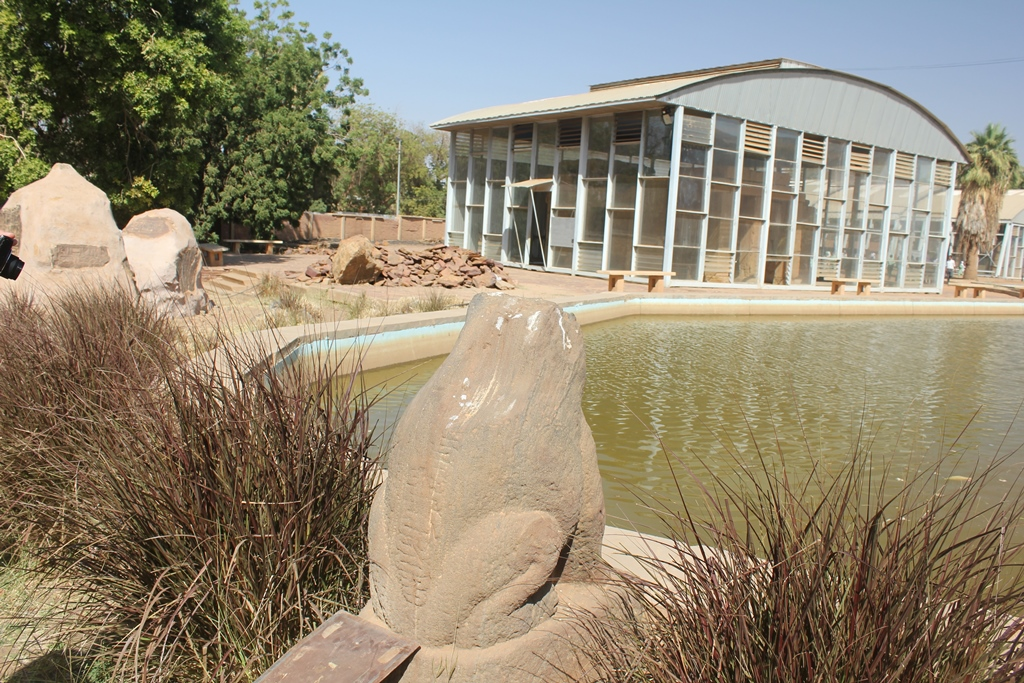
Meroitic frog

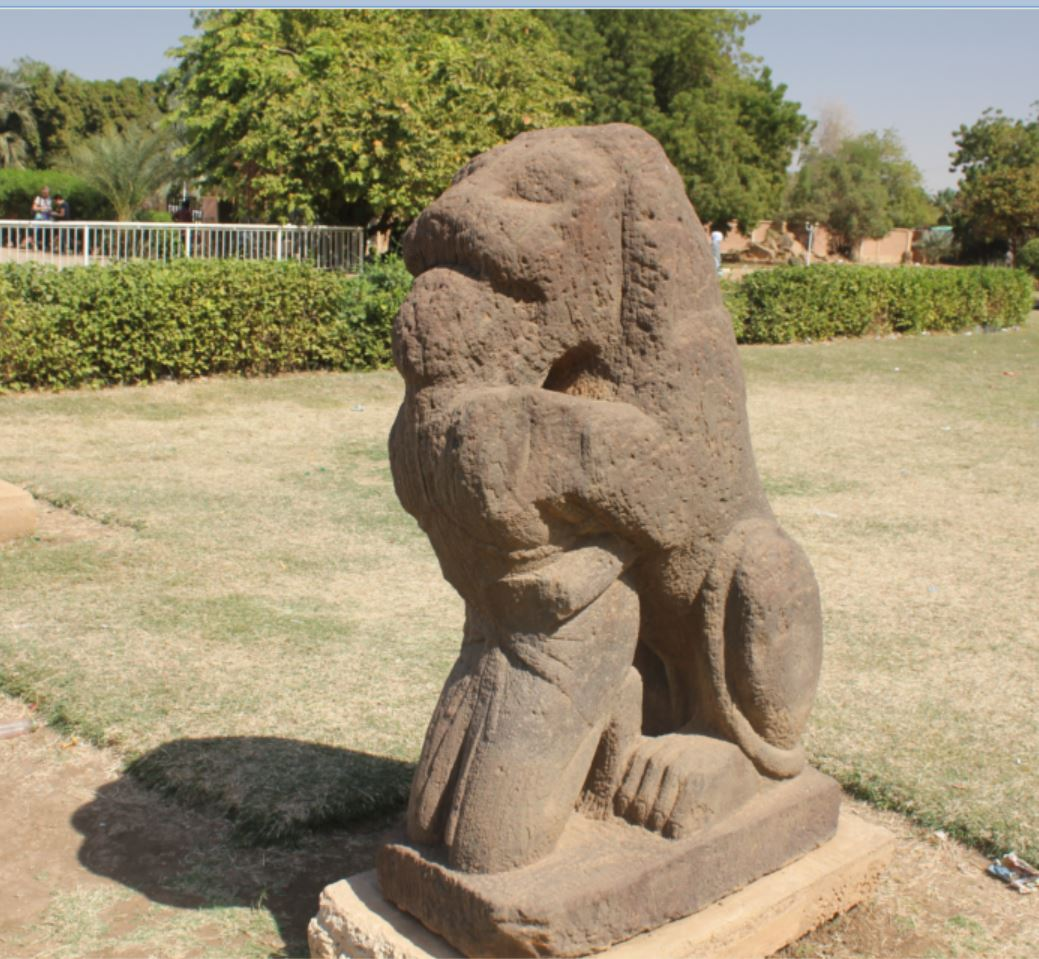
Man-eating Lion

== Archaeological research in Sudan ==
After decades of excavations by foreign archeological teams in the 20th century, Sudanese archeologists were gradually trained and included in these excavations and subsequent research. At the end of 2022, The Guardian reported about a new generation of Sudanese archeologists, including a large number of young women. Trained at the Department of Archeology of the University of Khartoum, this new generation represented a growing number of professionals for Sudan’s National Corporation of Antiquities and Museums, who were adding their skills and perspective on the heritage of Sudan to foreign-led research and studies.

== See also ==
- Relief of Gebel Sheikh Suleiman
- List of museums in Sudan
- Nubian Archaeological Expeditions
- Sudan Archaeological Research Society
