= Helen Jacquet-Gordon =

American Egyptologist

- Born: February 7, 1918; New York City, US
- Died: April 26, 2013 (aged 95); Carouge, Switzerland

Helen Jacquet-Gordon, born Helen Wall-Gordon (born February 7, 1918 in New York, US; died April 26, 2013 in Carouge, Switzerland) was an American Egyptologist.

== Scholarly training ==
Her mother was a painter, and her father, who died in 1939, was a musician. Her interest in history was sparked as a teenager, and she soon devoured, by her own account, almost everything she could find on the subject in the city libraries. In 1936, she enrolled at Barnard College in New York and later transferred to Columbia University, where she received a diploma in history in 1940 and a master's degree in 1942 for a dissertation on Gertrude Bell. After initially working in a low-paying position at an industrial confectionery, she served in the United States Army Intelligence during World War II, where she was responsible for encrypting and decrypting classified messages.

After World War II, Gordon turned to Egyptology. She wanted to deepen her knowledge in this field and introduced herself to Nora Scott, who, in her capacity as curator at the Metropolitan Museum, recommended her to the Assyriologist Adolf Leo Oppenheim. Oppenheim agreed to give her two hours of lessons a week. Gordon quickly became familiar with Alan Gardiner's grammar and sign system, which led Oppenheim to ask her if she would like to become an Egyptologist. Nora Scott then took over her training, giving her private lessons, which were later continued by the Egyptologist Walter Federn at the University of Vienna. In September 1949, Gordon finally went to France, where she followed her future husband, Jean Jacquet, who had initially studied architecture in Geneva and was now training as a musician at the Paris Conservatoire. However, the couple separated after three months.

During her "Paris years," she initially applied with letters of recommendation from Oppenheim to Christiane Desroches Noblecourt and Jean Sainte-Fare Garnot, who accepted her into their seminars at the École pratique des hautes études, section de sciences religieuses. At the same time, she attended lectures by Georges Posener and Michel Malinine at the Section des sciences historiques et philologiques and listened to lectures by Jacques Vandier and Pierre du Bourguet at the Institut Catholique de Paris. During these years, she met Jean Yoyotte and Serge Sauneron and, in the summer of 1950, embarked on a journey through Europe from Paris on a bicycle that Jean Yoyotte had given her. In November 1953, she completed her studies at the École pratique des hautes études, graduating with a diploma in Egyptology. In her thesis Les Noms des domaines funéraires sous l’Ancien Empire, she thematically represented a thesis which was published in 1962 by the Institut français d’archéologie orientale and quickly gained acceptance within Egyptological circles.

== Career ==
After another year of studies at the École pratique, Gordon received a scholarship from the International Federation of University Women, which enabled her to conduct her own fieldwork in Egypt for the first time. On September 21, 1955, she arrived in Alexandria and went first to Cairo, where she stayed with Bernard Bothmer. From there, she visited numerous tombs in Saqqara and Giza that had not yet been explored and became acquainted with Ahmed Fakhry. Above all, however, she used her time in Egypt for a stay in Luxor, where she copied the graffiti and inscriptions from the 22nd and 23rd Dynasties on the roof of the Temple of Khonsu in the Karnak Precinct of Amun. These three months of studies on the Third Intermediate Period of Egypt subsequently became her professional specialization and culminated in a 2003 publication entitled The temple of Khonsu, Vol. 3. The graffiti of the Khonsu Temple roof at Karnak: a manifestation of personal piety.

From the beginning of April to June 1956, she also participated as a research assistant with Jean Yoyotte in an expedition led by Rudolf Anthes, which aimed to excavate the ruins of Mit Rahina, the second oldest capital of Ancient Egypt, located not far from Memphis. Here Gordon was able to prove herself for the first time and, together with William Kelly Simpson, was responsible for preparing the discovered faience, votive offerings, and other objects, as well as copying and compiling the most important inscriptions found there. While Gordon's achievements at Mit Rahina were truly impressive, she also had the good fortune to meet her long-time friend Jean Jacquet there again. In 1955, in his capacity as an architect, he decided to continue the officially concluded first campaign with his own crew in the area of the small temple of Ramses II and its forecourt. Under extremely adverse conditions, he was able to unearth a stone libation vessel and a series of votive tablets in honor of the god Ptah, as well as statuettes of the goddess Taweret, within eight weeks. These were among the most significant finds of the entire mission. Gordon then assisted him with a translation and interpretation of the inscription on the libation vessel and the publication of his findings.

In March 1958, Helen Gordon and Jean Jacquet embarked on a research trip to Luxor, where they married on June 23, 1958, at the Chicago House of the Oriental Institute. From that day forward, the paths of these two researchers never diverged. In 1960, Helen Jacquet-Gordon followed her husband to Abu Simbel, where he was preparing to relocate several monumental seated statues—colossal statues from the time of Ramesses II—which were threatened by flooding at their original location. Although not employed by the institute, she contributed to his work by producing numerous epigraphic studies on site, though these were not intended solely for publication.

Out of interest in Meroitic culture, they participated in an expedition to Tabo from 1965 to 1977, led by Charles Maystre, where the temple of the god Amun was excavated and two colossal statues of the Meroitic king Natakamani were recovered. A total of nine excavation campaigns were carried out during this archaeological mission in the southern part of Argo Island. In 1967 and 1968, they also worked under the direction of Serge Sauneron on the exploration of Christian sites in the vicinity of Esna, but their main passion always remained the sites around the Karnak temples near Luxor. According to Philippe Collombert, the name of the Jacquet couple will remain inextricably linked to those archaeological sites in North Karnak to which they devoted themselves under the auspices of the IFAO between 1968 and 1977, and again between 1986 and 1992, in the district of Amun.

Among her most important discoveries in the temple precinct was certainly the excavation and identification of a treasury belonging to King Thutmose I and its storehouses. Fragments of furniture and inscribed stone blocks, 16 bronze figures, ivory tusks, faience and ceramics, fragments of statues and statuettes, fragments of signet rings and 163 seal impressions of officials from the Middle Kingdom of Egypt and the Second Intermediate Period, fragments of reliefs and stelae, flint objects, and other items were unearthed in the area of the Monthu Temple. Since the rich and diverse range of finds was often initially stored on-site in storage rooms, Irmgard Hein has been conducting a detailed inventory of the objects found there since 2013. Her true passion, however, lay with the roof of the Temple of Khonsu at Karnak, built by Ramesses III. Here, in the winter of 1955/56, Helen Jacquet-Gordon had copied a total of 334 graffiti from the Third Intermediate and Late Periods, along with their inscriptions, within three months. When she returned to these artifacts between 1968 and 1977, evaluating and attempting to verify the epigraphic studies she had previously undertaken through her own translations, she rediscovered the genealogy of King Takelot III, which had been defaced and fragmented by vandalism after 1960. She also provided evidence of the hitherto completely unknown King Ini, whom the Egyptologist David A. Aston dated to approximately 747–742 BC, thus assigning him to the 23rd Dynasty. The accuracy of her findings was confirmed by Yoyotte and Jean-Marie Kruchten, and, with regard to the identification of Pharaoh Ini, again by Jean Yoyotte, who identified the cartouche of Ini that she had discovered with the one on the Louvre stele C 100 and the one on the Durham bronze N 2186.[24] Yoyotte's arguments were accepted by virtually all Egyptologists, including Jürgen von Beckerath and Thomas Schneider. Her discoveries here can therefore be considered very significant. She herself also documented her find sites in 1959/60 and 1987 using photographs, most of which she took herself. In 1970, Charles Bonnet created a plan for her of the roof of the Temple of Khonsu, on which all the stone slabs, as well as the graffiti and inscriptions, were listed numerically.

Lanny Bell, the then-director of the Chicago House in Luxor, advised her to carefully edit the material collected there and then publish it at the Oriental Institute in Chicago, which she did in 2003. Until 1992, the Jacquet-Gordon couple lived primarily in an adobe house built by Alexandre Varille. After leaving Egypt, they returned to Luxor for the last time in 2007 and organized their photographic archive at the Chicago House, which they donated to the Chicago House library in 2008. Helen Jacquet-Gordon died on April 26, 2013, in Carouge, Switzerland.Her husband, Jean Jacquet, survived her and died in 2016.

== Publications ==
- (as Helen K. Wall): A first glimpse of Egypt. In: Newsletter of the American Research Center in Egypt. Nummer 22, 30. June 1956, 1956, pp.22–23 (LINK).
- (as Helen Wall-Gordon): A New Kingdom libation basin dedicated to Ptah, second Part: The inscriptions. In: Festschrift zum 80. Geburtstag von Professor Dr. Hermann Junker, II. Teil = Mitteilungen des Deutschen Archäologischen Instituts, Abteilung Kairo. Band 16, 1958, S. 168–175 (PDF)
- Les noms des domaines funéraires sous l’Ancien Empire égyptien (= Bibliothèque d'étude. Institut Français d'Archéologie Orientale. Band 34). Institut Français d'Archéologie Orientale, Kairo 1962.
- The Illusory Year 36 of Osorkon I, Journal of Egyptian Archaeology 53, 1967, pp.63-68 JSTOR
- with Charles Bonnet, Jean Jacquet: Pnubs and the Temple of Tabo on Argo Island. In: The Journal of Egyptian Archaeology. Band 55, 1969, S. 103–111 (Link).
- Les Ermitages chrétiens du désert d’Esna III. Céramique et objets (= Fouilles de l'Institut français d'archéologie orientale. Band 29/3). Institut Français d'Archéologie Orientale, Kairo 1972.
- Alexandre Piankoff: The Wandering of the Soul (= Egyptian religious texts and representations Band 6; = Bollingen Series. Band 40/6). Completed and prepared for publication by Helen Jacquet-Gordon. Princeton University Press, Princeton 1974, ISBN 0-691-09806-9 (Digitized).
- Deux graffiti de l'époque libyenne sur le toit du temple de Khonsu à Karnak. In: Jean Vercoutter (Hrsg.): Hommages à la mémoire de Serge Sauneron (1927–1976). Band 1: Égypte pharaonique (= Bibliothèque d'étude. Band 81). IFAO, Kairo 1979, S. 167–183 (Auszüge).
- Karnak-Nord VI: Le trésor de Thoutmosis I.: la décoration (= Fouilles de l'Institut Français d'Archéologie du Caire. Band 32, 1 und Band 32, 2). Institut Français d'Archéologie Orientale, Kairo 1988, ISBN 2-7247-0074-0, ISBN 2-7247-0075-9.
- Karnak-Nord VIII: Le trésor de Thoutmosis I.: Statues, stèles et blocs réutilisés (= Fouilles de l'Institut Français d'Archéologie du Caire. Band 39). Institut Français d'Archéologie Orientale, Kairo 1999, ISBN 2-7247-0231-X.
- The Temple of Khonsu, Vol. 3. The Graffiti on the Khonsu Temple roof at Karnak: a manifestation of personal piety (= The Oriental Institute Publications Chicago. Band 123). Institute of the University of Chicago, Chicago 2003, ISBN 1-885923-26-0 PDF
- H. Jacquet Gordon, The Meroitic Kiosk at Tabo (pp.95-104) in THE JOURNAL OF THE SOCIETY FOR THE STUDY OF EGYPTIAN ANTIQUITIES, Volume XXXII (32), Toronto Canada PDF
- H. Jacquet-Gordon, “A Habitation Site at Karnak North Prior to the New Kingdom”, in M. Bietak, E. Czerny (eds.), The Synchronisation of Civilisations in the Eastern Mediterranean in the Second Millenium B.C. III: Proceedings of the SCIEM 2000 – 2nd EuroConference, Vienna, 28th of May – 1st of June 2003, Vienna, 2007, pp. 317–324
- "The Festival on which Amun Went out to the Treasury PDF" in Causing His Name to Live. Studies in Egyptian Epigraphy and History in Memory of William J. Murnane. Edited by Peter J. Brand and Louise Cooper, CHANE 37, 2009, pp.121-123
- Karnak-Nord X: Le trésor de Thoutmosis I.: La céramique (= Fouilles de l'Institut Français d'Archéologie Orientale du Caire.Band 65, 1 und Band 65, 2). Institut Français d'Archéologie Orientale, Kairo 2012, ISBN 978-2-7247-0609-3, ISBN 978-2-7247-0610-9.
