= Shinnie =

Shinnie is a surname. Notable people with the surname include:

- Andrew Shinnie (born 1989), Scottish footballer
- Graeme Shinnie (born 1991), Scottish footballer, brother of Andrew
- Peter Shinnie (1915–2007), British archaeologist and Africanist
