= Ruiu =

Nubian official

Ruiu was a Nubian official at the beginning of the 18th Dynasty. He was chief of Teh-khet and was, therefore, a governor ruling a region in Lower Nubia for the Egyptian state. In the New Kingdom, Egyptian kings had conquered Lower Nubia. To secure control over the new region they appointed people of the local elite as governors. Teh-khet was a Nubian region that covered about Debeira and Serra. The local governors here formed a family, whilst the governor proper held the title chief of Teh-khet.

Ruiu is mainly known from monuments of his children, and the only known monument commissioned by Ruiu himself is a stela that was bought onto Elephantine dedicated to his parents, his father Teti Djawia and his mother Ahhotep. The monument today is located in the Pushkin Museum in Moscow.

Otherwise, Ruiu is mainly known from the inscriptions of his sons Djehutyhotep and Amenemhat. They also became chief of Teh-khet. In their inscriptions, they often mention that they were begotten of Ruiu. Ruiu was the brother of a certain official called Senmose who had a decorated tomb chapel at Qubbet el-Hawa. It is, therefore, possible to reconstruct a family of local, Nubian officials whose family members were in charge over three generations.
