= Christogram =

Monogram for Jesus Christ

Chrismon

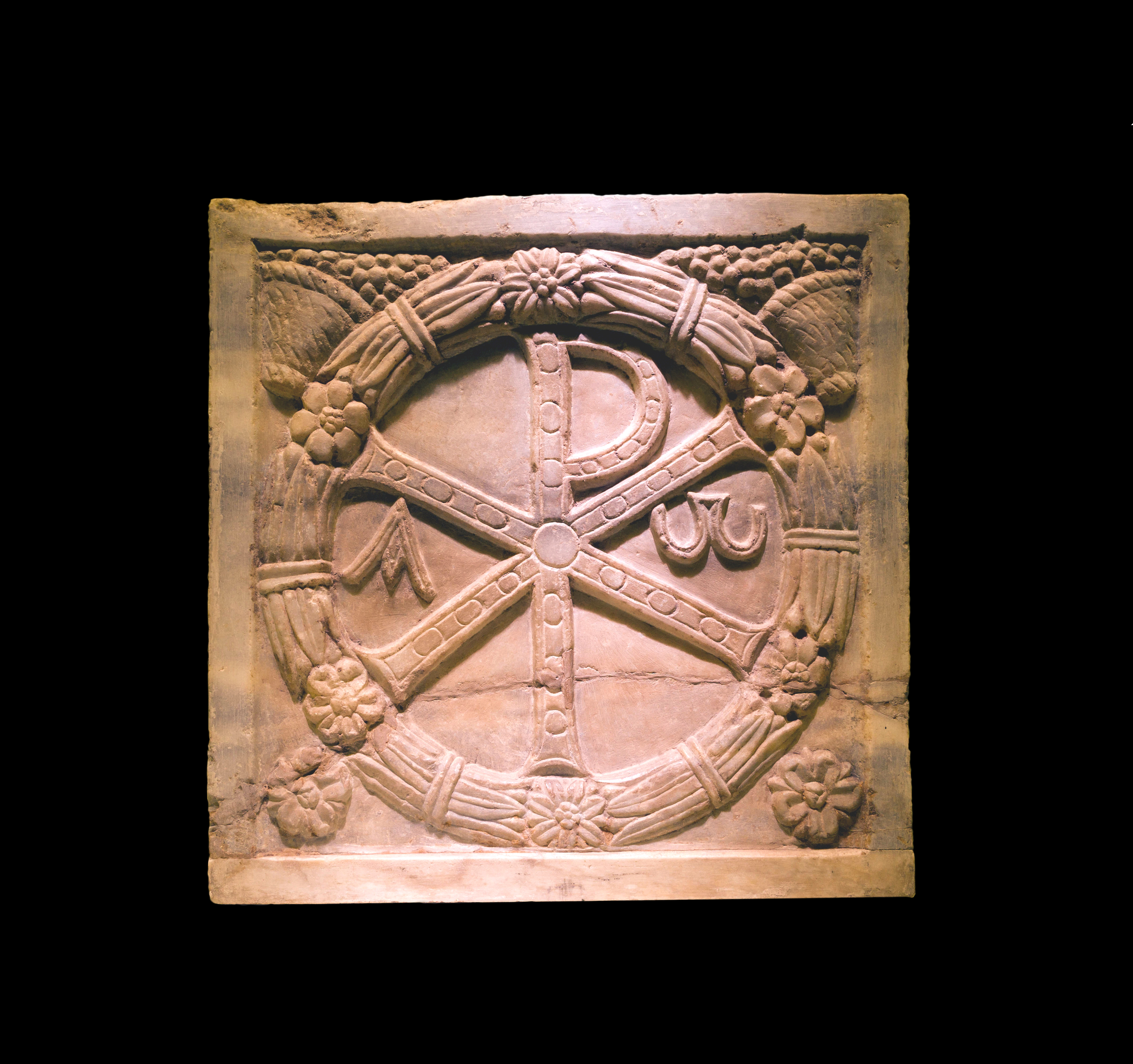
Chi-Rho symbol with Alpha and Omega on a 4th-century sarcophagus (Vatican Museums)

A Christogram (Latin: Monogramma Christi) (Note: The portmanteau of Christo- and -gramma is modern, first introduced in German as Christogramm in the mid-18th century. Its adoption into English as Christogram dates to c. 1900.) is a monogram or combination of letters that forms an abbreviation for the name of Jesus Christ, traditionally used as a religious symbol within the Christian Church.

One of the oldest Christograms is the Chi-Rho (☧). It consists of the superimposed Greek letters chi (Χ) and rho (Ρ), which are the first two letters of the Greek χριστός, 'Christ'. It was displayed on the labarum military standard used by Constantine I in 312 AD. The IX monogram is a similar form, using the initials of the name Ἰησοῦς (ὁ) Χριστός, 'Jesus (the) Christ', as is the ΙΗ monogram, using the first two letters of the name ΙΗΣΟΥΣ, 'JESUS' in uppercase.

There were a very considerable number of variants of "Christograms" or monograms of Christ in use during the medieval period, with the boundary between specific monograms and mere scribal abbreviations somewhat fluid.

The name Jesus, spelled ΙΗΣΟΥΣ in Greek capitals, has the abbreviations IHS (also written JHS, IHC, or ΙΗΣ). The name Christus, spelt ΧΡΙΣΤΟΣ, has XP (and inflectional variants such as IX, XPO, XPS, XPI, XPM). In Eastern Christian tradition, the monogram ΙϹΧϹ (with Overline indicating scribal abbreviation) is used for Ἰησοῦς Χριστός in both Greek and Cyrillic tradition.

A Middle Latin term for abbreviations of the name of Christ is chrisimus. Similarly, the Middle Latin crismon, chrismon refers to the Chi-Rho monogram specifically.

== Symbols ==
=== Chi (Χ) ===
In antiquity, the cross, i.e. the instrument of Christ's crucifixion (crux, stauros), was taken to be T-shaped, while the X-shape ("chiasmus") had different connotations. There has been scholarly speculation on the development of the Christian cross, the letter Chi used to abbreviate the name of Christ, and the various pre-Christian symbolism associated with the chiasmus interpreted in terms of "the mystery of the pre-existent Christ".

In Plato's Timaeus, it is explained that the two bands which form the "world soul" (anima mundi) cross each other like the letter Chi, possibly referring to the ecliptic crossing the celestial equator:

And thus the whole mixture out of which he cut these portions was all exhausted by him. This entire compound divided lengthways into two parts, which he joined to one another at the centre like the letter X, and bent them into a circular form, connecting them with themselves and each other at the point opposite to their original meeting-point; and, comprehending them in a uniform revolution upon the same axis, he made the one the outer and the other the inner circle.

— Plato, Timaeus, 8.36b and 8.36c

The two great circles of the heavens, the equator and the ecliptic, which, by intersecting each other form a sort of recumbent chi and about which the whole dome of the starry heavens swings in a wondrous rhythm, became for the Christian eye a heavenly cross.

— Rahner 1971, pp. 49–50. See also Grigg 1977, p. 477

Justin Martyr in the 2nd century makes explicit reference to Plato's image in Timaeus in terms of a prefiguration of the Holy Cross. An early statement may be the phrase in Didache, "sign of extension in heaven" (sēmeion epektaseōs en ouranōi).

An alternative explanation of the intersecting celestial symbol has been advanced by George Latura, claiming that Plato's "visible god" in Timaeus is the intersection of the Milky Way and the Zodiacal Light, a rare apparition important to pagan beliefs. He said that Christian bishops reframed this as a Christian symbol.

The most commonly encountered Christogram in English-speaking countries in modern times is the Χ (or more accurately, Chi), representing the first letter of the word Christ, in such abbreviations as Xmas (for "Christmas") and Xian or Xtian (for "Christian").

=== Iota Chi (IX) ===
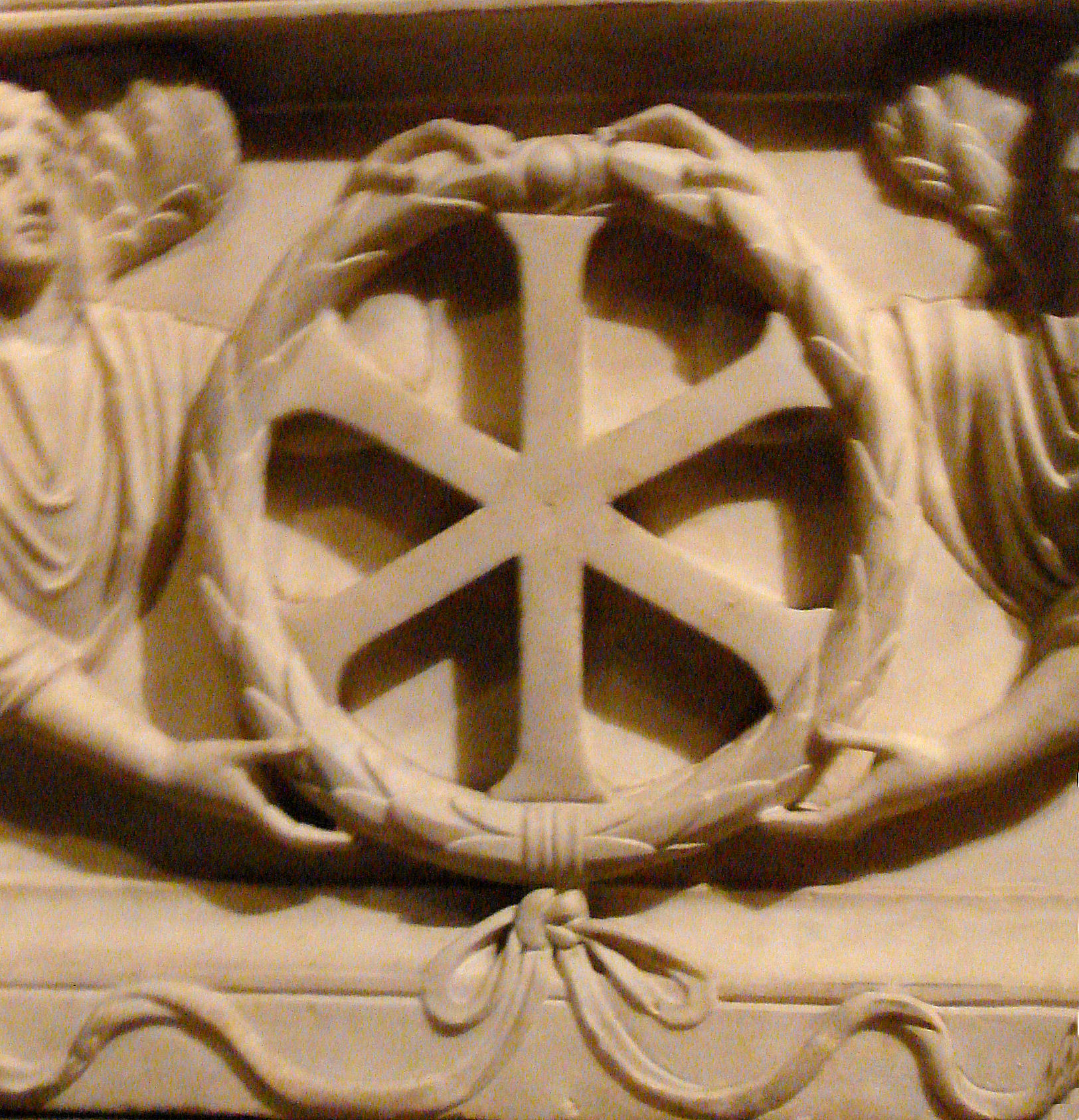
A IX monogram from a 4th century Sarcophagus from Constantinople

An early form of the monogram of Christ, found in early Christian ossuaries in Palestine, was formed by superimposing the first (capital) letters of the Greek words for Jesus and Christ, i.e. iota Ι and chi Χ, so that this monogram means "Jesus Christ".

=== Chi Rho (ΧΡ) ===
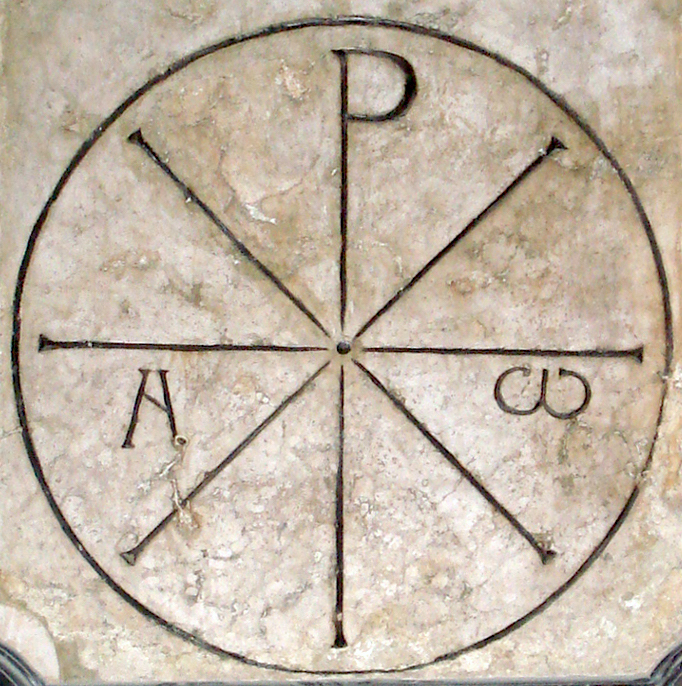
A Chi Rho combined with Alpha and Omega, in 1669 labelled Chrismon Sancti Ambrosii, Milan Cathedral (Note: The symbol was moved to storage for the refurbishments under Pellegrino Tibaldi and re-instated in the choir on 6 September 1669. Use of the name Chrismon is apparently based on the term crismon as used by Landulf of Milan; Landulf's mention of a crismon of Saint Ambrose clearly refers to chrism, i.e. holy oil, not a symbol.)

The Alpha and Omega symbols may at times accompany the Chi-Rho monogram. Since the 17th century, Chrismon (chrismum; also chrismos, chrismus) has been used as a Neo-Latin term for the Chi Rho monogram.

Because the chrismon was used as a kind of "invocation" at the beginning of documents of the Merovingian period, the term also came to be used of the "cross-signatures" in early medieval charters. (Note: While in English literature of the 19th to mid 20th century, chrismon refers to the Chi Rho monogram exclusively, the German-language usage has also come to be adopted in some cases in the specific context of medieval sigla, especially in works translated from German into English, e.g. Hans Belting, Edmund Jephcott (trans.), Likeness and Presence: A History of the Image Before the Era of Art (1997), pp. 107–109.) Chrismon in this context may refer to the Merovingian period abbreviation I. C. N. for in Christi nomine, later (in the Carolingian period) also I. C. for in Christo, and still later (in the high medieval period) just C. for Christus.

St Cuthbert's coffin (late 7th century) has an exceptional realisation of the Christogram written in Anglo-Saxon runes, as ᛁᚻᛋ ᛉᛈᛋ, transliterated to the Latin alphabet as 'IHS XPS', with the chi rendered as the eolh rune (the old z or algiz rune) and the rho rendered as the p-rune.

=== IHS ===
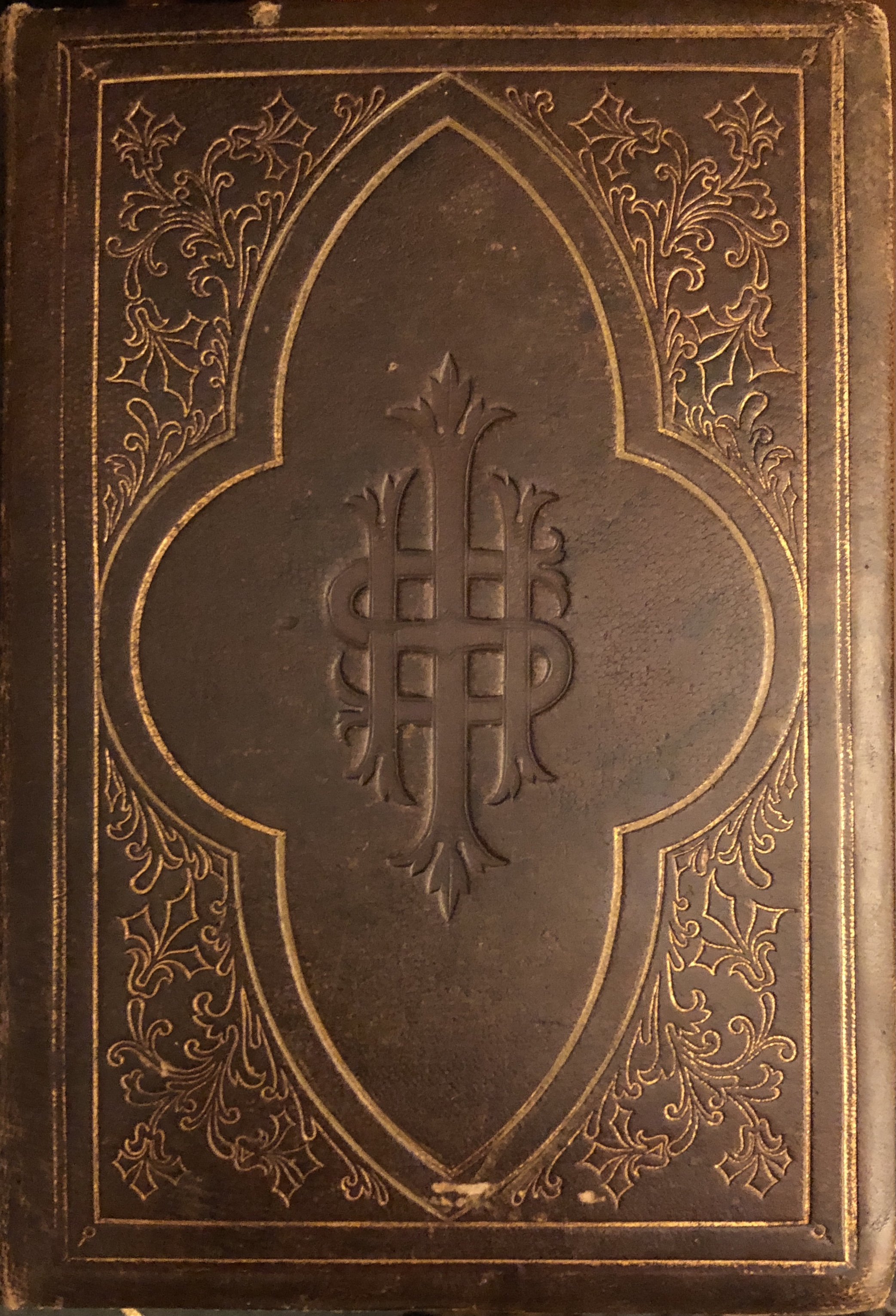
IHS Christogram embossed on an 1864 leather-bound King James Bible

In the Latin-speaking Christianity of medieval Western Europe (and so among Catholics and many Protestants today), the most common Christogram became "IHS" or "IHC", denoting the first three letters of the Greek name of Jesus, ΙΗΣΟΥΣ, iota-eta-sigma, or ΙΗΣ.

The Greek letter iota is represented by 'I', and the eta by 'H', while the Greek letter sigma is either in its lunate form, represented by 'C', or its final form, represented by 'S'. Because the Latin-alphabet letters I and J were not systematically distinguished until the 17th century, "JHS" and "JHC" are equivalent to "IHS" and "IHC".

"IHS" is sometimes interpreted as meaning ΙΗΣΟΥΣ ΗΜΕΤΕΡΟΣ ΣΩΤΗΡ, Iēsous Hēmeteros Sōtēr, 'Jesus our Saviour' or in Latin Jesus Hominum (or Hierosolymae) Salvator, ('Jesus, Saviour of men [or: of Jerusalem]' in Latin) or connected with In Hoc Signo. English-language interpretations of "IHS" have included "In His Service" or "In His Steps." Such interpretations are known as backformed acronyms.

Used in Latin since the seventh century, the first use of IHS in an English document dates from the fourteenth century, in Piers Plowman. In the 15th century, Saint Bernardino of Siena popularized the use of the three letters on the background of a blazing sun to displace both popular pagan symbols and seals of political factions like the Guelphs and Ghibellines in public spaces (see Feast of the Holy Name of Jesus).

The IHS monogram with the H surmounted by a cross above three nails and surrounded by a Sun is the emblem of the Jesuits, according to tradition introduced by Ignatius of Loyola in 1541.

IHS has been known to appear on gravestones, especially among Irish Catholics.

==== Gallery with different formats of the symbol ====
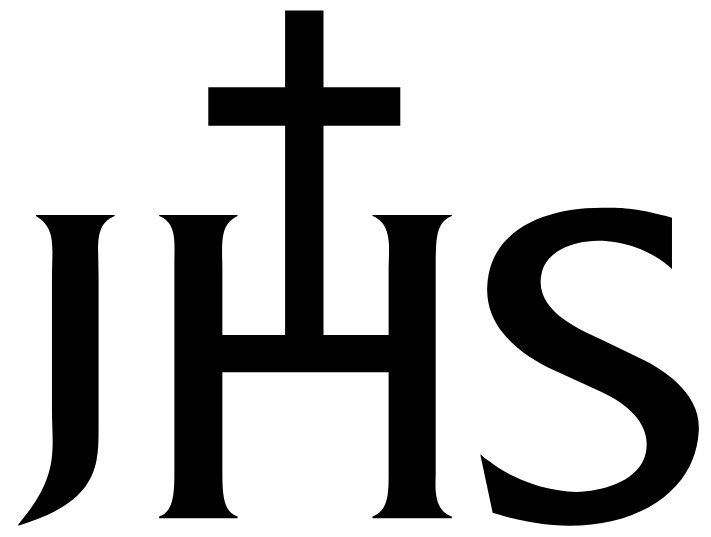
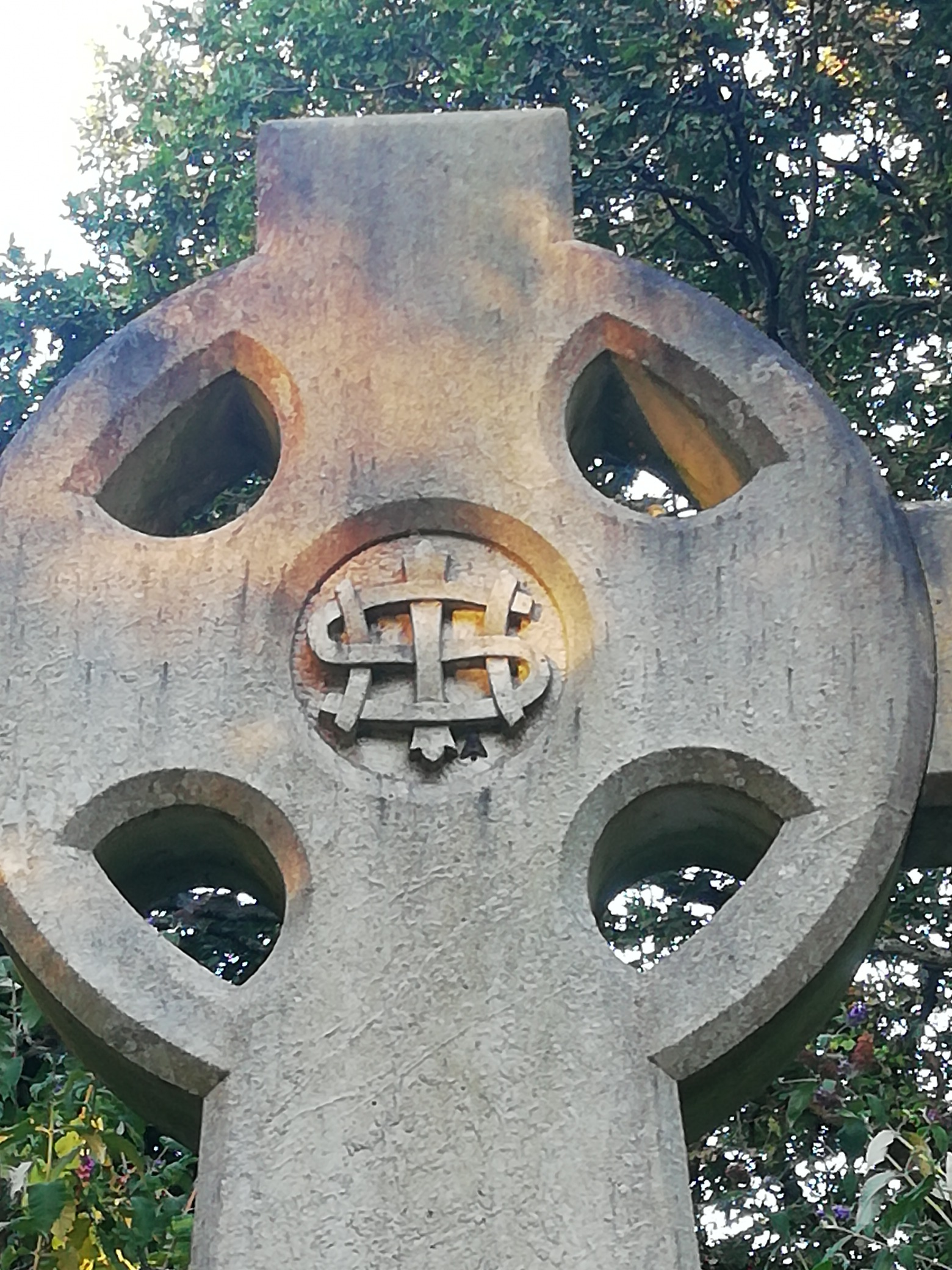
Northwood Cemetery Isle of Wight
IHS or JHS Christogram of western Christianity

Medieval-style IHC monogram

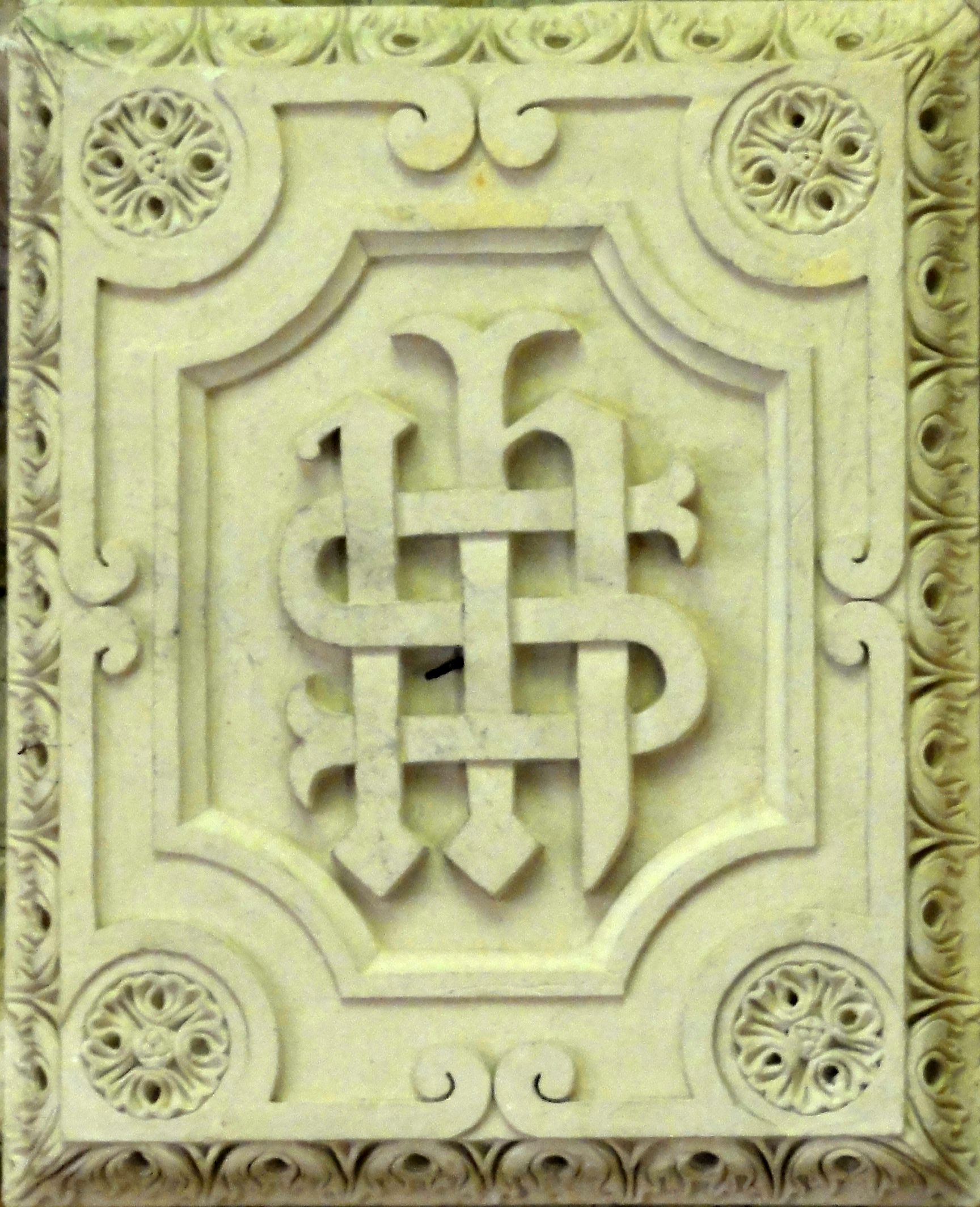
Intertwined IHS monogram, Saint-Martin's Church, L'Isle-Adam, Val-d'Oise

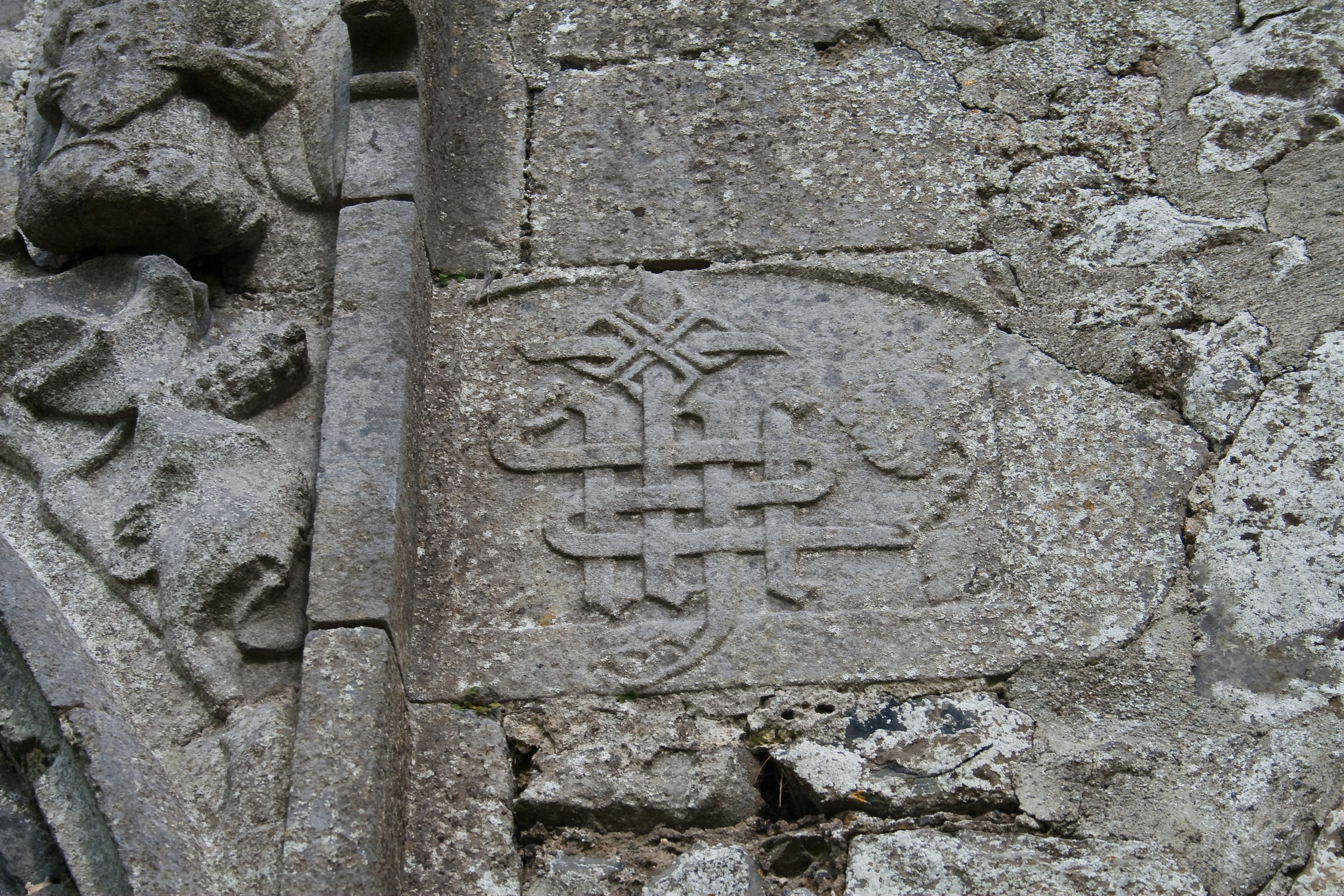
IHC monogram from Clontuskert Abbey, Ireland

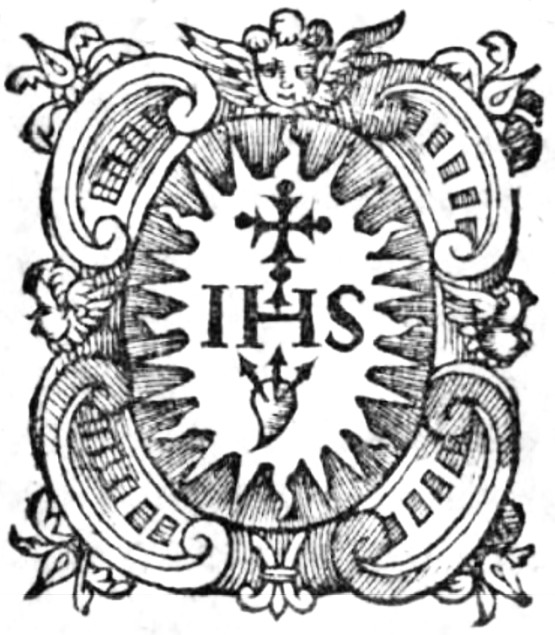
The Jesuit emblem from a 1586 print

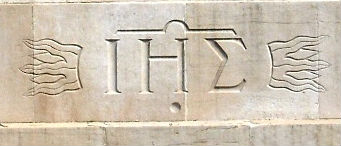
ΙΗΣ on the Reformation Wall in Geneva, Switzerland

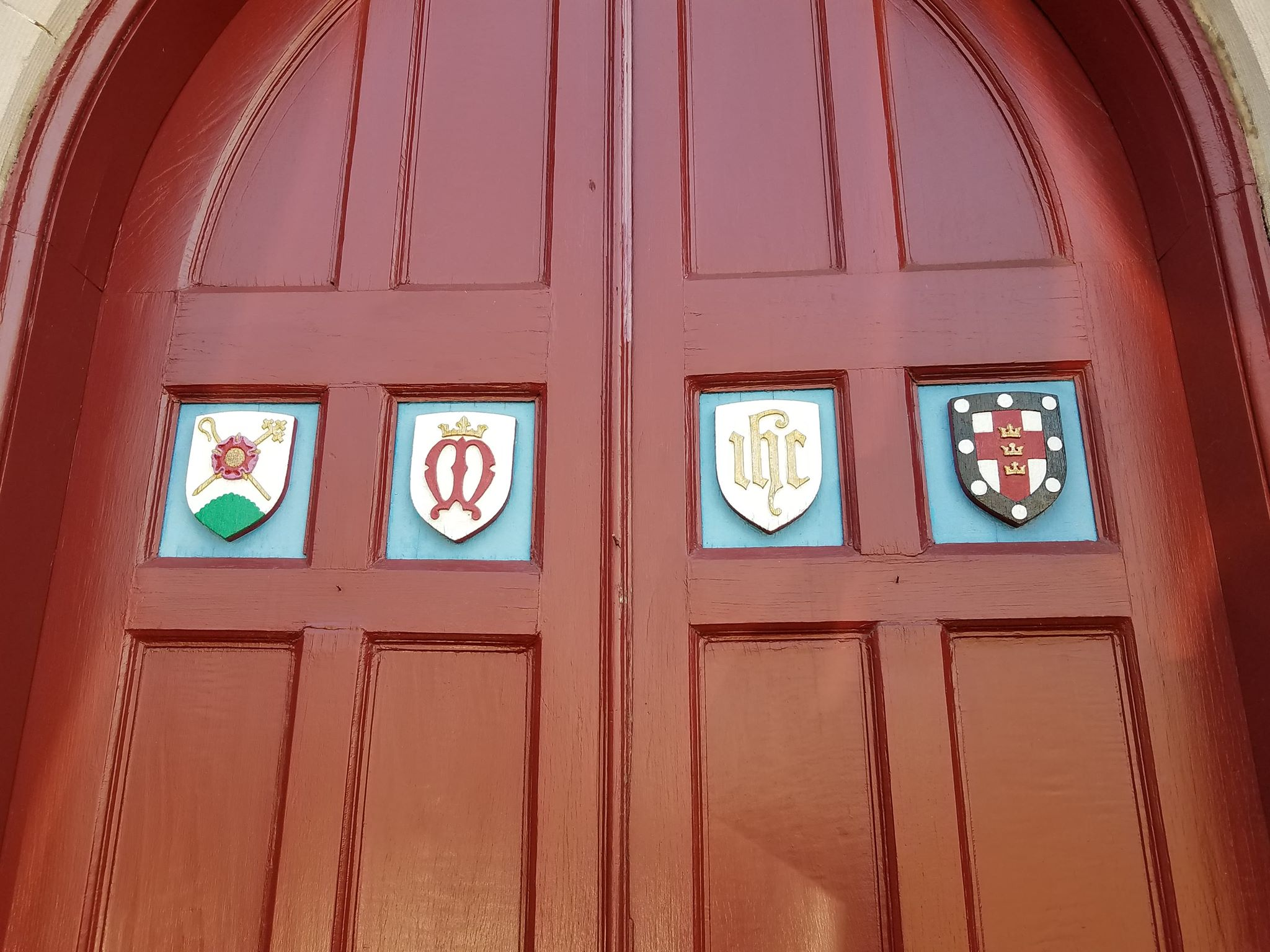
Door at Church of the Good Shepherd (Rosemont, Pennsylvania) showing (from left) arms of the parish; Marian monogram; the IHS Christogram; and arms of the Episcopal Diocese of Pennsylvania

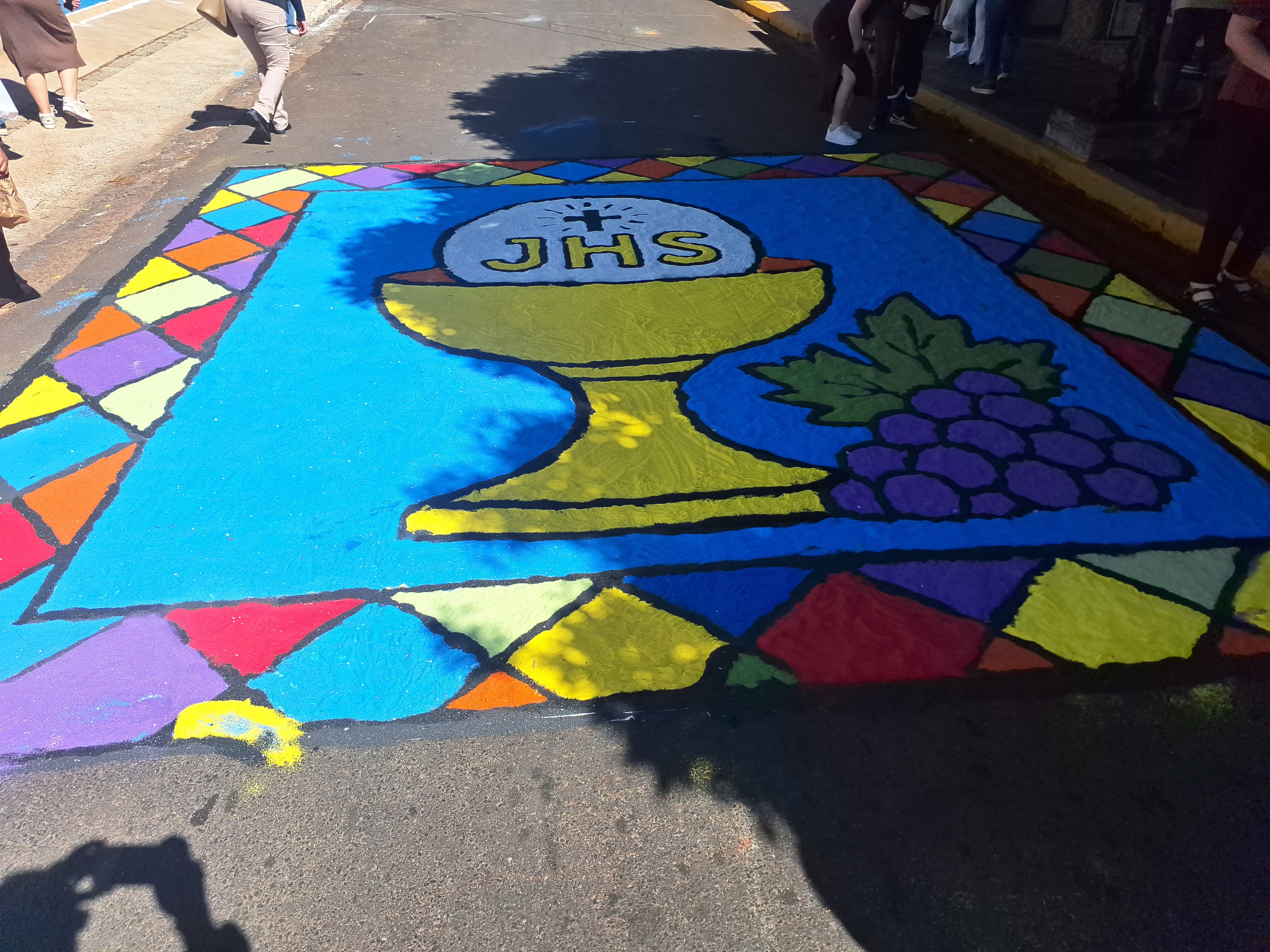
Corpus Christi carpet with the use of the acronym in São Manuel, São Paulo, Brazil.

=== ICXC ===
In Eastern Orthodoxy and Eastern Catholicism, the most widely used Christogram is a four-letter abbreviation, ΙϹ ΧϹ—a traditional abbreviation of the Greek words for 'Jesus Christ' (i.e., the first and last letters of each of the words ΙΗϹΟΥϹ ΧΡΙϹΤΟϹ, with the lunate sigma 'Ϲ' common in medieval Greek), and written with titlo (diacritic) denoting scribal abbreviation (І︮С︯ Х︮С︯).

On icons, this Christogram may be split: 'ΙϹ' on the left of the image and 'ΧϹ' on the right. It is sometimes rendered as 'ΙϹ ΧϹ ΝΙΚΑ' (Ἰησοῦς Χριστὸς νικᾷ), meaning 'Jesus Christ Conquers'. 'ΙϹΧϹ' may also be seen inscribed on the Ichthys.

Depiction of the 'ΙϹ ΧϹ ΝΙΚΑ' arrangement in medieval Greek tradition

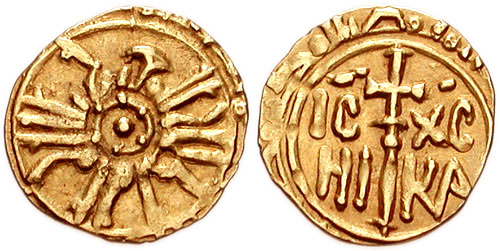
'ΙϹ ΧϹ ΝΙΚΑ' cross on the obverse of a 12th-century Sicilian coin (Roger II)

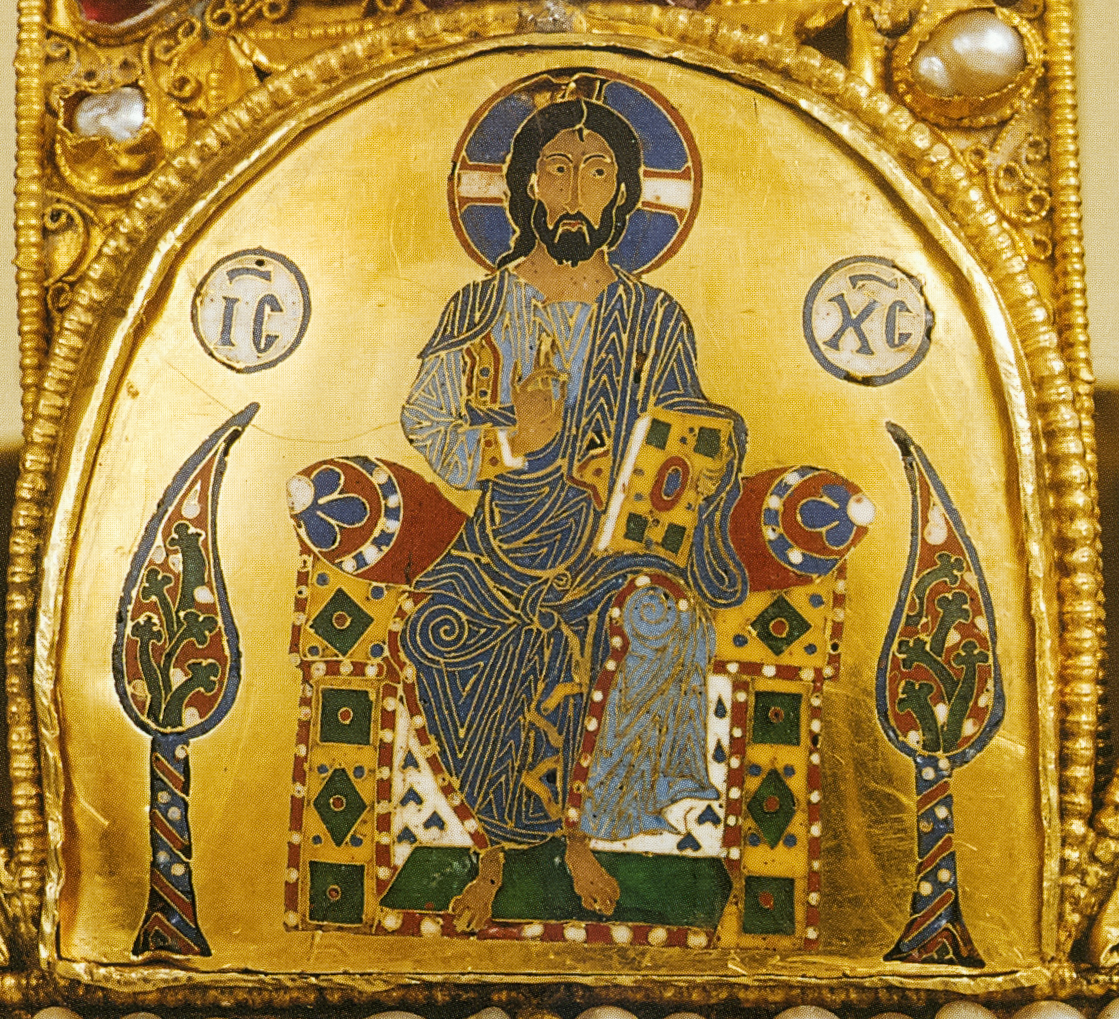
Christ Pantocrator on the Holy Crown of Hungary (12th century)

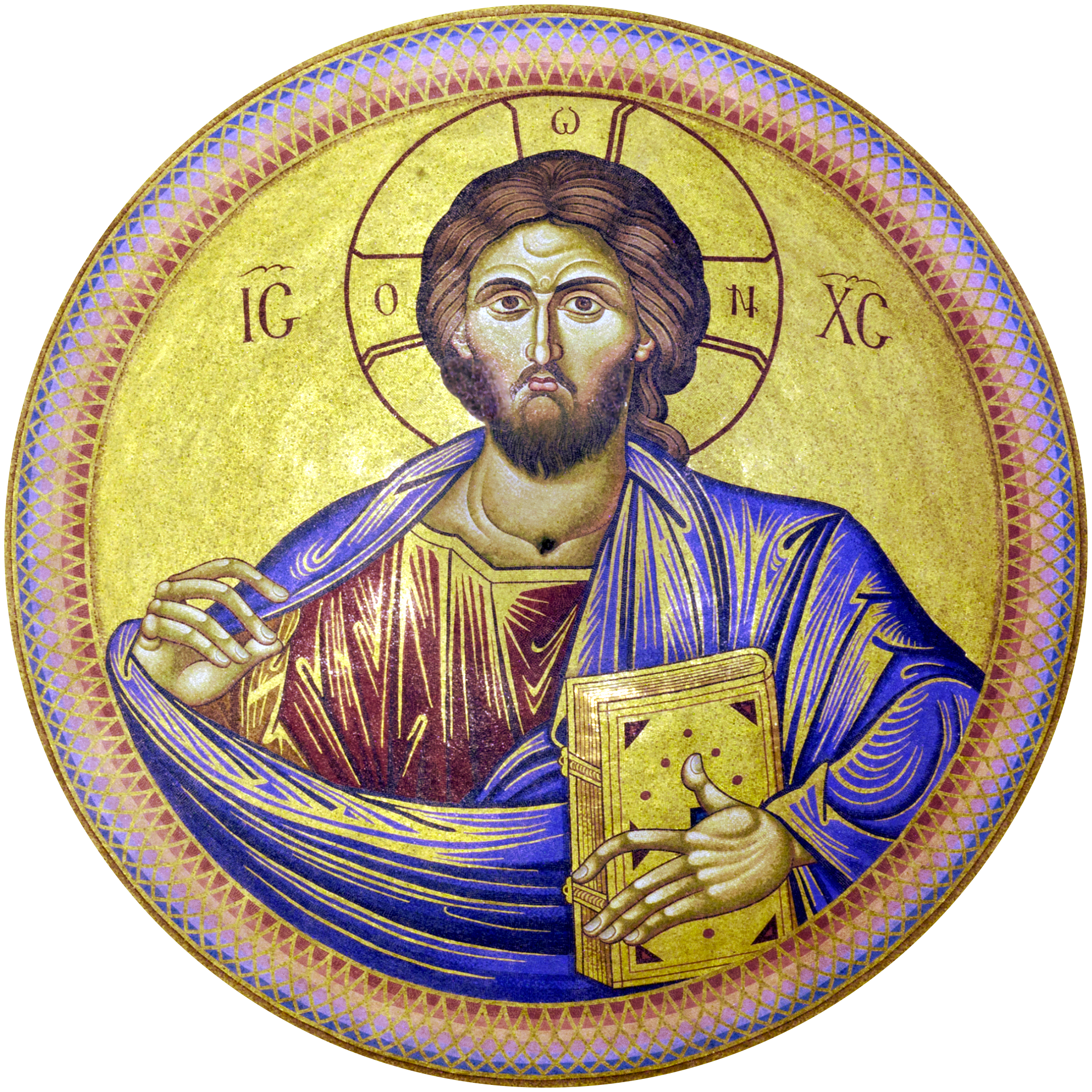
Christ Pantocrator, Church of the Holy Sepulchre (1810)

=== Lhq ===
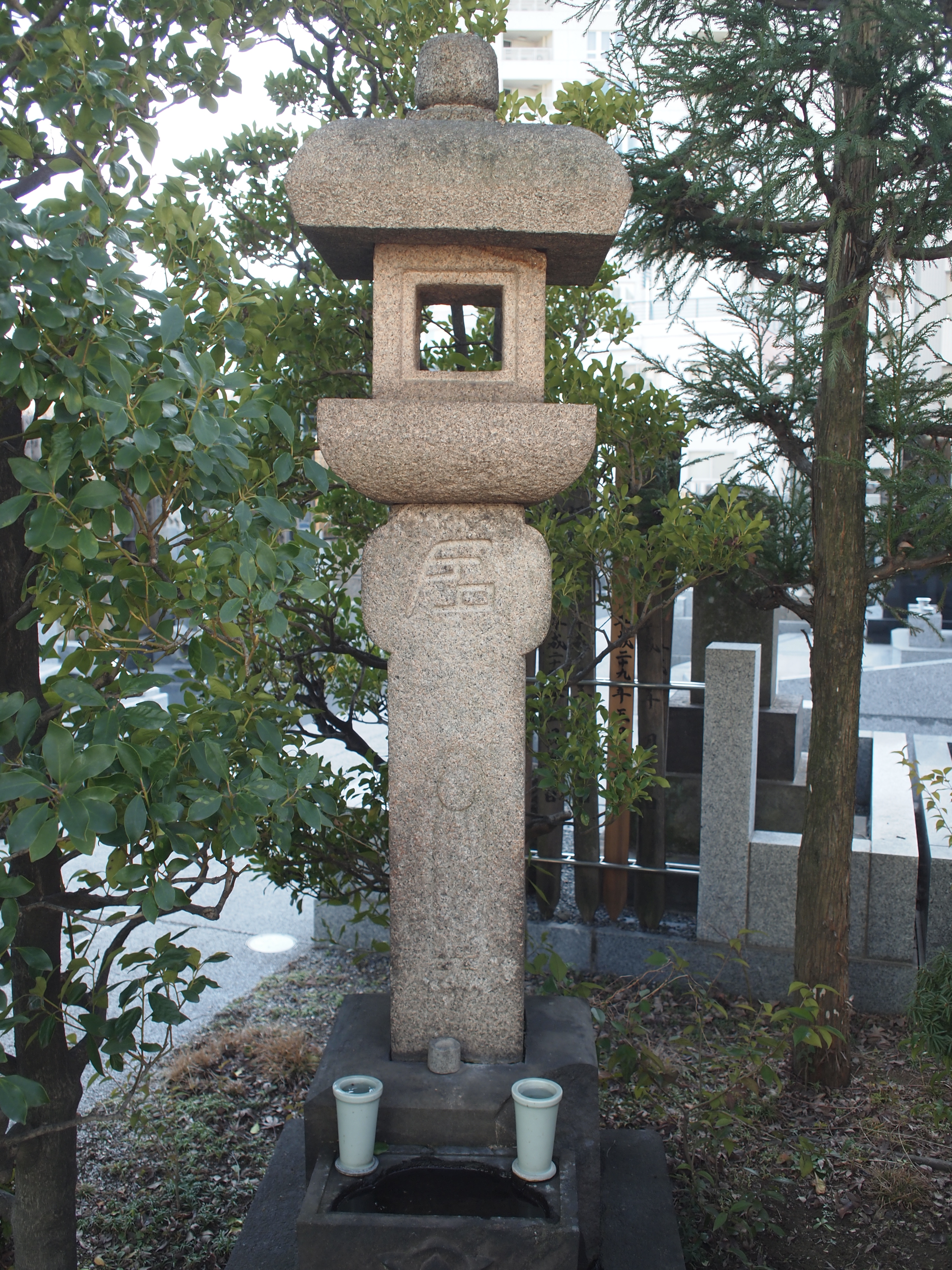
Lhq-inscription on a Japanese lantern

After Francis Xavier landed in Kagoshima, Japan, in 1549, his missionary work grew and became widely distributed throughout Japan under the patronage of the daimyō. However, during the Edo period (1603–1867), Christians were persecuted and forced to hide. Because they were forbidden to openly reverence the images of Christ or Mary, it is believed that they transferred their worship to other carved images and marked them with secret symbols understood only by the initiates. Certain Japanese lanterns, notably the Kirishitan dōrō (キリシタン灯籠, 'Christian lanterns'), did bear the "Lhq" monogram, which, a quarter turned, was engraved on the shaft (sao), which was buried directly into the soil without basal platform (kiso). The 'Lhq' monogram corresponds to the distorted letters 'IHS'.

== Archaeology ==
In 2016, a 1,300-year-old corpse, was found in a cemetery near a medieval monastery in Ghazali, Sudan, whose right foot bore a tattoo from medieval Nubia, a region that covered parts of modern-day Egypt and Sudan, depicting a Chi Rho and an Alpha Omega. The person, most likely male, lived sometime between 667 and 774.

== See also ==
- Christian symbolism
- Holy Name of Jesus
- INRI
- Little Sachet
- Names and titles of Jesus
- Nomina sacra
