= Ghalia Garelnabi =

Sudanese museum director

- غالية جار النبي
- Education: University of Khartoum; University of Warsaw
- Employer(s): National Corporation of Antiquities and Museums

Ghalia Garelnabi Babiker (Arabic: غالية جار النبي) is an archaeologist and museum director from Sudan. As of 2024 she was director of the National Corporation of Antiquities and Museums in Sudan. She has also held the post of Acting Director of the National Museum of Sudan.

== Career ==
Garelnabi has a degree in Archaeology from the University of Khartoum, a MA in Museum Documentation from the University of Warsaw and a PhD from the University of Khartoum. She began work at the National Corporation of Antiquities and Museums (NCAM) in 1983. As of 2022 she was Acting Director of the National Museum of Sudan. By December that year she was Deputy Director of NCAM; then, by 2024 Garelnabi was Director of NCAM. During her tenure, as a consequence of the Sudanese Civil War, objects from the collections of the National Museum of Sudan were stolen, and some were found being sold on at the border with, and within, South Sudan. She has also face accusations that she, and her predecessor at the National Museum of Sudan, have been involved in illicit antiquities trading.

Garelnabi has commented to The Guardian on how gender diversity in archaeology in Sudan has increased in her lifetime: during her studies there were three women on the course, but in 2022 there were 20.
