= Djehutyhotep (chief of Teh-khet) =

Nubian official

Djehutyhotep, also called Paitsy, was a Nubian official under Hatshepsut and Thutmosis III. He was chief of Teh-khet and was therefore a governor ruling a region in Lower Nubia of the Egyptian state. In the New Kingdom, Egyptian kings had conquered Lower Nubia. To secure control over the new region they appointed people of the local elite as governors. Teh-khet was a Nubian region that covered the area about Debeira and Serra. The local governors here formed a family, while the governor proper held the title chief of Teh-khet. Djehutyhotep's father Ruiu was also chief of Teh-khet. His mother was called Runia. His wife was called Tenetnub. His brother Amenemhat was also chief of Teh-khet and followed Djehutyhotep in office.

Djehutyhotep is known from several monuments. The most important one is his decorated rock-cut tomb in Debeira-East. The rock-cut chapel consists of three chambers; the first one is decorated with paintings. A second room contained the badly preserved remains of statues. It is one of the very few decorated New Kingdom rock-cut tombs in Lower Nubia.

Djehutyhotep is depicted next to his brother Amenemhat in the tomb of Senmose at Qubbet el-Hawa. Senmose was the brother of Ruiu and therefore Djehutyhotep's uncle. Djehutyhotep appears in a short rock inscription near Aswan and on objects found at Debeira-West.
