= Amenemhat (chief of Teh-khet) =

Nubian official

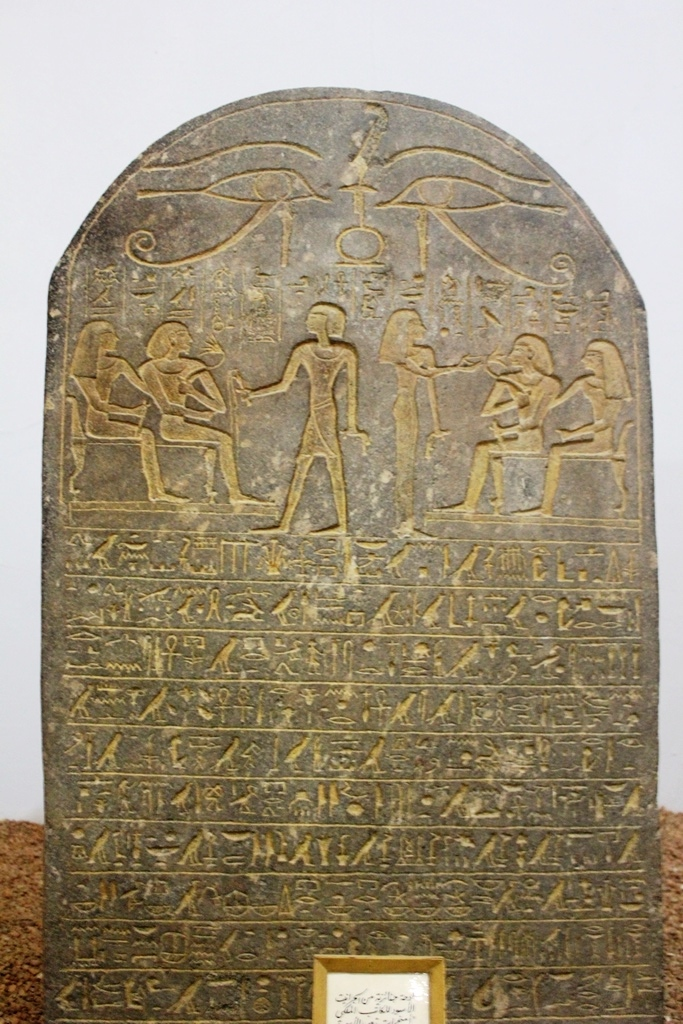
Stela showing Amenemhat and his family, found in his tomb

Amenemhat was a Nubian official under Hatshepsut and Thutmosis III. He was chief of Teh-khet and was therefore a governor ruling a region in Lower Nubia for the Egyptian state. In the New Kingdom, Egyptian kings had conquered Lower Nubia. To secure control over the new region they appointed people of the local elite as governors. Teh-khet was a Nubian region that covered the area about Debeira and Serra. The local governors here formed a family, while the governor proper held the title chief of Teh-khet.

Amenemhat is known from several monuments. A statue found at Buhen indicates that he started his career as a simple scribe under king Thutmosis I before he followed his brother in office. He was probably appointed during the reigns of Hatshepsut and Thutmosis III. Amenemhat was the son of the chief of Teh-khet Ruiu, while his brother Djehutyhotep followed Ruiu in office and was followed then by Amenemhat himself.

Amenemhat's tomb was discovered on the West Bank of the Nile in the Debeira district. The tomb's superstructure included a mud brick-built structure with a pyramid in the middle. Within the pyramid there was an offering chapel. In front of the pyramid was a courtyard. In the underground burial chambers were found different objects, including coffins and canopic jars. The latter bear the name Paitsy, which is the second name of Djehutyhotep; the brother of Amenememhat. Djehutyhotep might have been buried here.
