= Peter Shinnie =

British archaeologist

P. L. Shinnie
- Born: Peter Lewis Shinnie; January 18, 1915; London, United Kingdom
- Died: July 9, 2007 (aged 92); Calgary, Canada
- Awards: Order of the Two Niles
- Scientific career
- Institutions: University of Ghana; University of Khartoum; University of Calgary

Peter Lewis Shinnie (January 18, 1915, in London – July 9, 2007, in Calgary) was a British archaeologist and Nubiologist. He was the author of Meroe: A Civilization of the Sudan (1967). He was awarded the Order of the Two Niles in 2004.

== Works ==
- Medieval Nubia (1954)
- Excavations at Soba (1955)
- Ghazali, a monastery in the northern Sudan 1961, concerning the Monastery in Ghazali
- Meroë: A civilization of the Sudan (1967)
- The African Iron Age (1971)
- Debeira West, a mediaeval Nubian town (1978)
- The capital of Kush (1980)
- Archaeology of Gonja, Ghana: Excavations at Daboya (1989)
- Ancient Nubia (1995)
- Early Asante (1995)

== Biography ==
- A personal memoir by P. L. Shinnie
- Reminiscences of an archeologist in the Sudan by P. L. Shinnie
- Peter Lewis Shinnie 1915-2007 by Nicholas David
- Peter Lewis Shinnie 1915-2007 by Krzysztof A. Grzymski
