= Monastery in Ghazali =

Monastery in the Bayuda Desert, Sudan

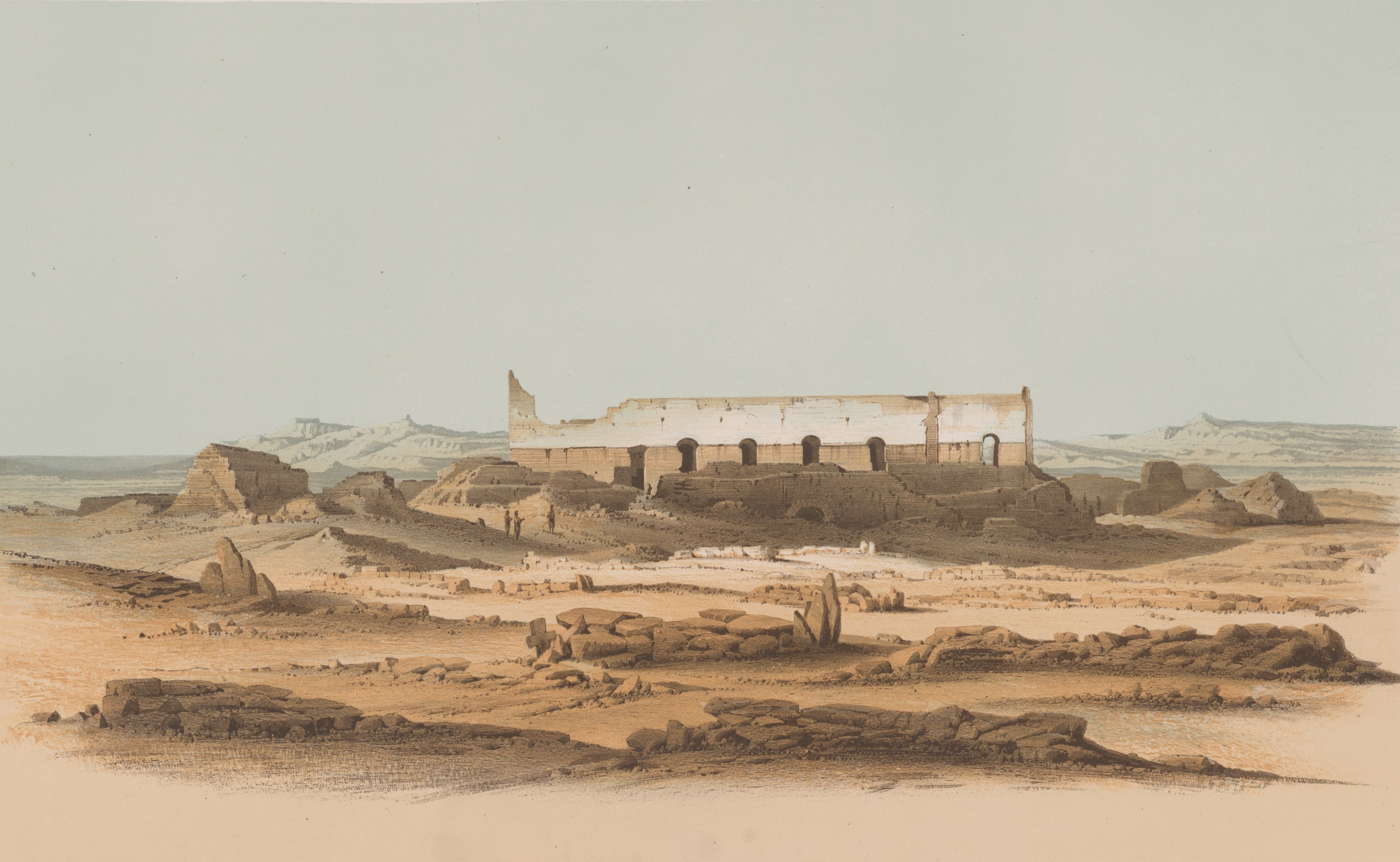
The remains of the Ghazali monastery, as painted in the mid-19th century by Karl Richard Lepsius

The Monastery in Ghazali was a medieval Christian monastery in the Bayuda Desert in northern Sudan. Probably founded by the Makurian king Merkurios in the late 7th century, it functioned until the 13th century.

== Archaeological research ==
Almost all famous travelers visited the site in the 19th century. The first excavations took place in the 1950s. From 2012 to 2018, research in Ghazali was conducted by a team of Polish archaeologists from the Polish Centre of Mediterranean Archaeology University of Warsaw, in cooperation with the National Corporation of Antiquities and Museums of Sudan. The project was directed by Artur Obłuski. At the same time, preparations were made for opening the site to visitors.

== Description of the site ==
A view from inside the ruins, also by Lepsius

Apart from the monastery, which is the main feature of the site in Ghazali, a settlement, cemeteries, and a metallurgical center with iron-smelting furnaces provided additional information on the daily life of the monks.

The North Church in Ghazali with a basilical layout was mentioned already by 19th-century travelers and was first excavated by Peter Shinnie’s expedition. It is a typical Makurian church. The younger South Church is built entirely of mud bricks.

The monastery also encompasses several other buildings that served different functions. A free-standing building contained at first six, and then twelve dormitories. The triple bedrooms were small, measuring about 20 square meters. Remains of a staircase indicate there was a second floor. A refectory (dining room) and installations for food production, such as a mill and an oil press, were found as well.

There is evidence suggesting the presence of a pilgrimage movement in Ghazali.

== Bibliography ==
The list contains a selection of the latest publications on the research in the monastery written in English.

- Stark, R., Ciesielska, J.A. (2019). Vertebral infection in a male individual buried in the monastic cemetery (Cemetery 2) at Ghazali (ca. 670–1270 CE), northern Sudan, International Journal of Paleopathology 24, 34–40
- Obłuski, A. El-Ghazali – a royal monastery in Northern Sudan?, Sudan and Nubia 22, 2018, 155–166
- Obłuski A., Ciesielska J., Stark R., Chlebowski A., Misiurny A., Żelechowski-Stoń M., el-Din Mahmoud Z. Qatar-Sudan Archaeological Project: Excavations at the Ghazali monastery from 2014 to 2016, Polish Archaeology in the Mediterranean 27/1, 2018, 245–271
- Obłuski, A., Ochała, G., Calaforra-Rzepka, C., Korzeniowska, M., Maślak, S., & ed-Din Mahmoud, E. The winter seasons of 2013 and 2014 in the Ghazali monastery. Polish Archaeology in the Mediterranean, 26(1), 2017, 367–398, https://doi.org/10.5604/01.3001.0012.1795
- Obłuski, A., Ochała, G., Bogacki, M., Małkowski, W., Maślak, S., & ed-Din Mahmoud, Z. Ghazali 2012: preliminary report. Polish Archaeology in the Mediterranean, 24(1), 2015, 431–442. https://doi.org/10.5604/01.3001.0010.0085
- Obłuski, A. Ghazali Site Presentation Project preliminary results, Der Antike Sudan. Mitteilungen der Sudanarchäologischen Gesellschaft zu Berlin e.V, 25, 2014, 197–205
