= Archaeological expeditions to Nubia =

An expedition of three, including Professor J.H. Breasted, occurred in November 1905. Later Chicago University expeditions occurred in the seasons 1962–63 and 1963–64; excavations between Abu Simbel and the Sudan border. The Coxe expeditions occurred in 1907–10 under the direction of D.R.McIver and L.Wooley. A later joint expedition with the Peabody Museum of Natural History sought to protect artefacts from rising water level's as a result of the building of the Aswan Low Dam.

Colorado University expeditions occurred during 1963–64. Site 6-B-36 located in the proximity of Wadi Halfa is identified as a cemetery complex. The site activity ranged from 2 to 5 kilometres North of the wadi. The university excavated cemeteries of Meroitic, X-Group, and Christian (Armelegos 1968). Site 24-V-13 located at Argin village is documented as containing objects of ceramic industry. Michigan University studied the people of the villages of Abu Simbel and Ballana from 1966–1986 onward. The Tombos expedition led by Stuart Tyson Smith (UCSB) occurred during 2000.

== Analysis ==
George Armelegos (Massachusetts University) analysed dental and skeletal pathology from the Colorado expeditions.
