= Argo Island =

Island

- Location within Sudan
- Country: Sudan
- State: Northern

Argo Island (also: Island of Arkô and Jezira Argo) is an island of the Nile in Sudan. The island contains a town of the same name and the Nubian archaeology site of Tabo.

== History ==
In the late medieval era Argo was home to the Mekkdom of Argo, a petty kingdom that rose around 1410. In the 1780s its ruling Zubayr dynasty was subjugated by the Shaigiya, who made it a vassal. After the Mamluks occupied Lower Dongola in 1812 they likewise made its rulers vassals and moved the king’s seat from Argo to Bani. In 1813 the Shaigiya sacked Argo while the Mamluks were away on campaign. According to local tradition its first king was al Hajj Muhammad. Argo’s king Tambal was deposed with Mamluk help and fled to Egypt. He returned in 1820 with the Turco-Egyptian expedition of Isma'il Kamil Pasha. The kingdom ended in 1821 with the Turco-Egyptian conquest of Sudan, after which the ruling family continued as local administrators.
