= Tabo (Nubia) =

Archaeological site of Nubia, today Sudan

Coordinates: 19.484667°N 30.426722°E

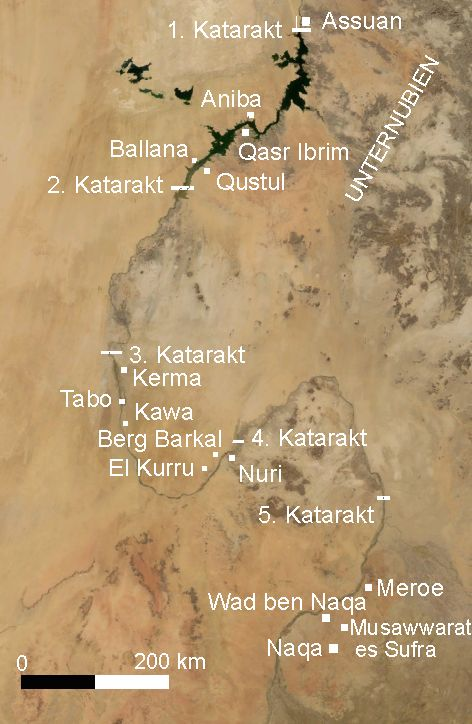
Map of Nubia, with ancient placenames; Tabo is in the center, and to the west.

Tabo is an archaeological mound site in Nubia, Sudan, in what was at one time the Kingdom of Kush. It is located at the southern end of the Argo Island in the Nile, just south of Kerma, approximately 40 kilometres (25 mi) north of Dongola. It draws its name from a small village, which is located near the ruins. Here at Tabo, there was a well preserved Amun temple. It was 75.6 metres (248 ft) long and 31 metres (102 ft) wide. The first pylon is 40 metres (130 ft) wide, the second 35.5 metres (116 ft). Based on these measurements, it is one of the largest Nubian temples. There was a courtyard with columns and a portico below. The temple is now heavily damaged, with local residents using this shrine as a quarry; the temple's stone blocks can be found in many of the neighboring villages.

Colossal statues of Sobekhotep III and temple ruins dating back to Middle Kingdom excavated in mid 1960's, currently located at Sudan's national museum

In the Makurian period a church was built on top of the ruined temple.

== Gallery ==
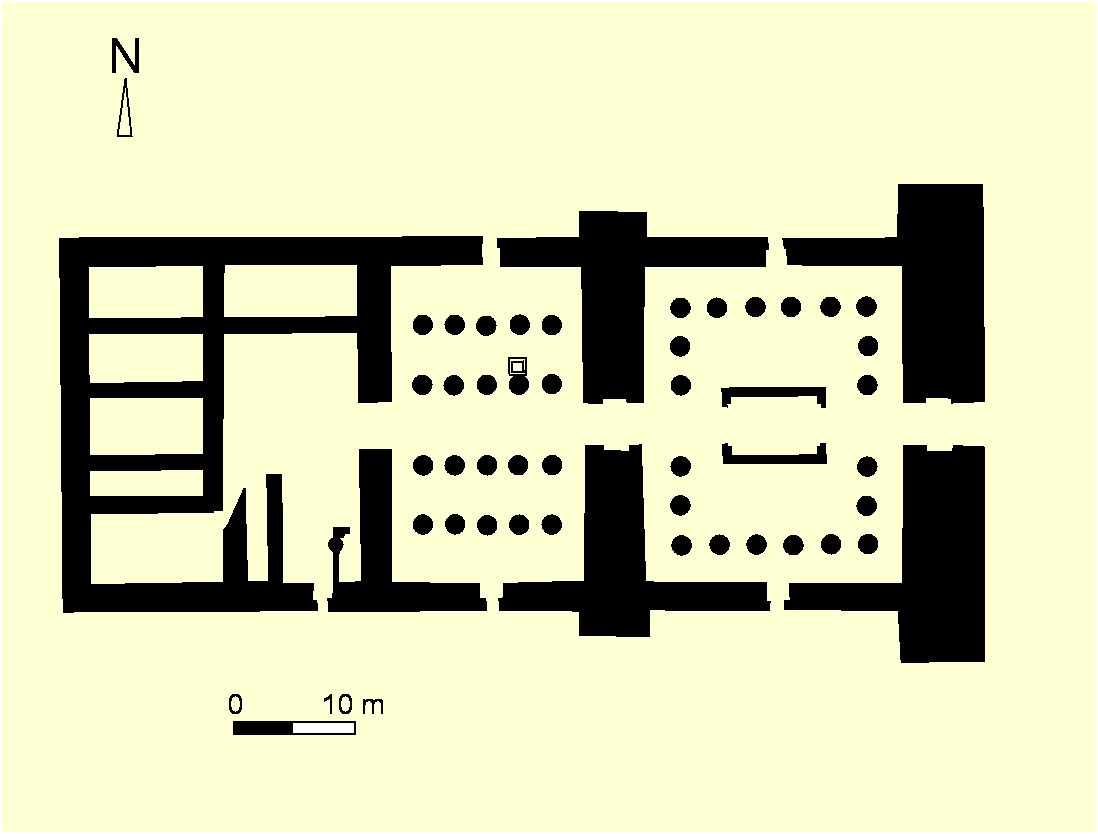
Plan of the Nubian temple at Tabo.

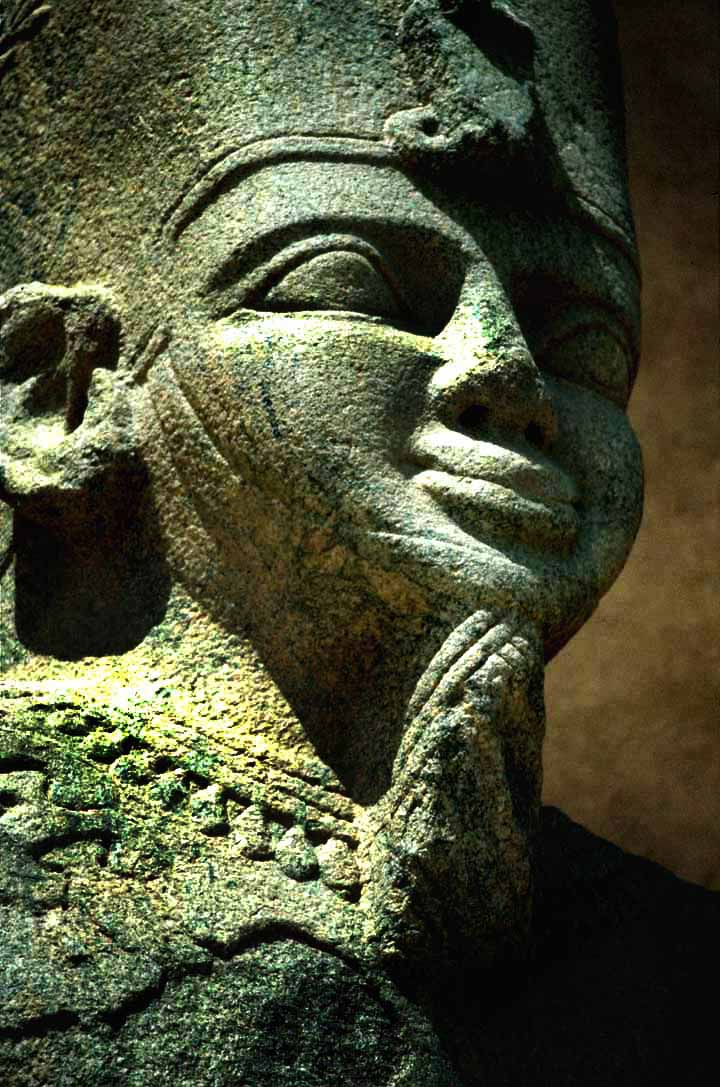
Statue of a Nubian king in Sudan, perhaps King Natakamani, found in Tabo.
