= Debeira =

- Location within Sudan
- 22°05′N 31°40′E
- Location: Northern, Sudan
- Region: Old Kingdom

Debeira is an archaeological site in Sudan situated on the eastern bank of the Nile some 20 kilometres north of Wadi Halfa.

== Early period ==
Excavations brought to light a necropolis of the C-Group culture. The necropolis site dates to ca. 2400–1550 BCE.

At Debeira-East a wall-painted funerary chapel of the Nubian prince (chief of Teh-khet) Djehutyhotep from the time of Hatshepsut and Thutmosis III was found. Other finds include a painted sarcophagus with iconography of the Twentieth Dynasty of Egypt. The sarcophagus and the painted scenes of the burial chamber were taken to the Sudan National Museum in Khartoum prior to the flooding of Debeira by Lake Nasser.

== Middle ages ==
The site was occupied by a small town or large village in the middle ages. Excavations between 1961 and 1964 by the University of Ghana showed the existence of a town with churches, a cemetery, and several large buildings. The site was inhabited between the 7th and 9th centuries, and abandoned after a decline that continued into the tenth century. The site was later redeveloped in the 11th century. The community consisted of several hundred people during this period.
