= Mirgissa =

Coordinates: 21.48°N 30.97°E

Mirgissa in hieroglyphs
M17 A2 q n N25
Iqen
Jqn

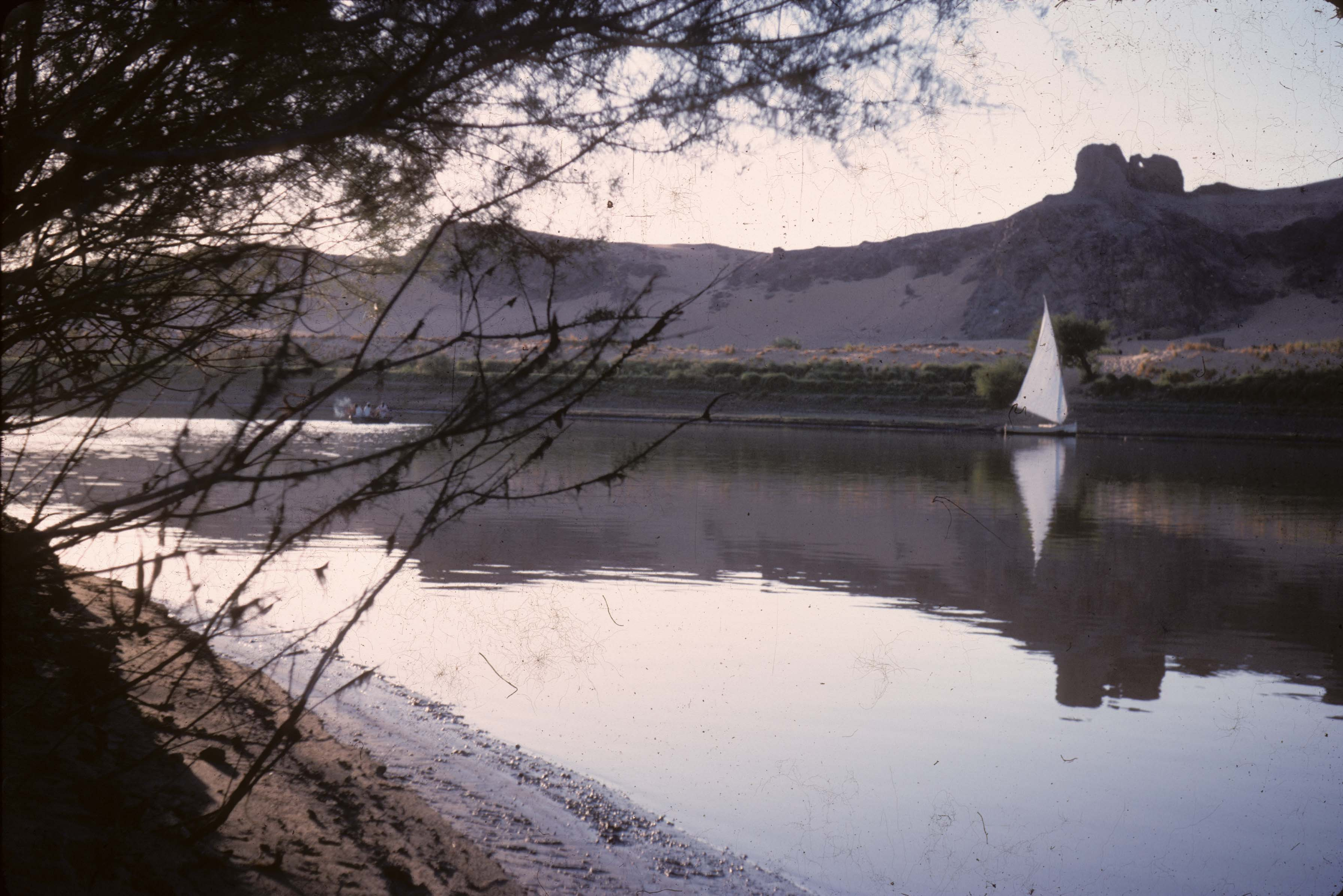
Mirgissa, the ancient Egyptian Fortress in Wadi Halfa territory, before it drowned because of the Egyptian high dam

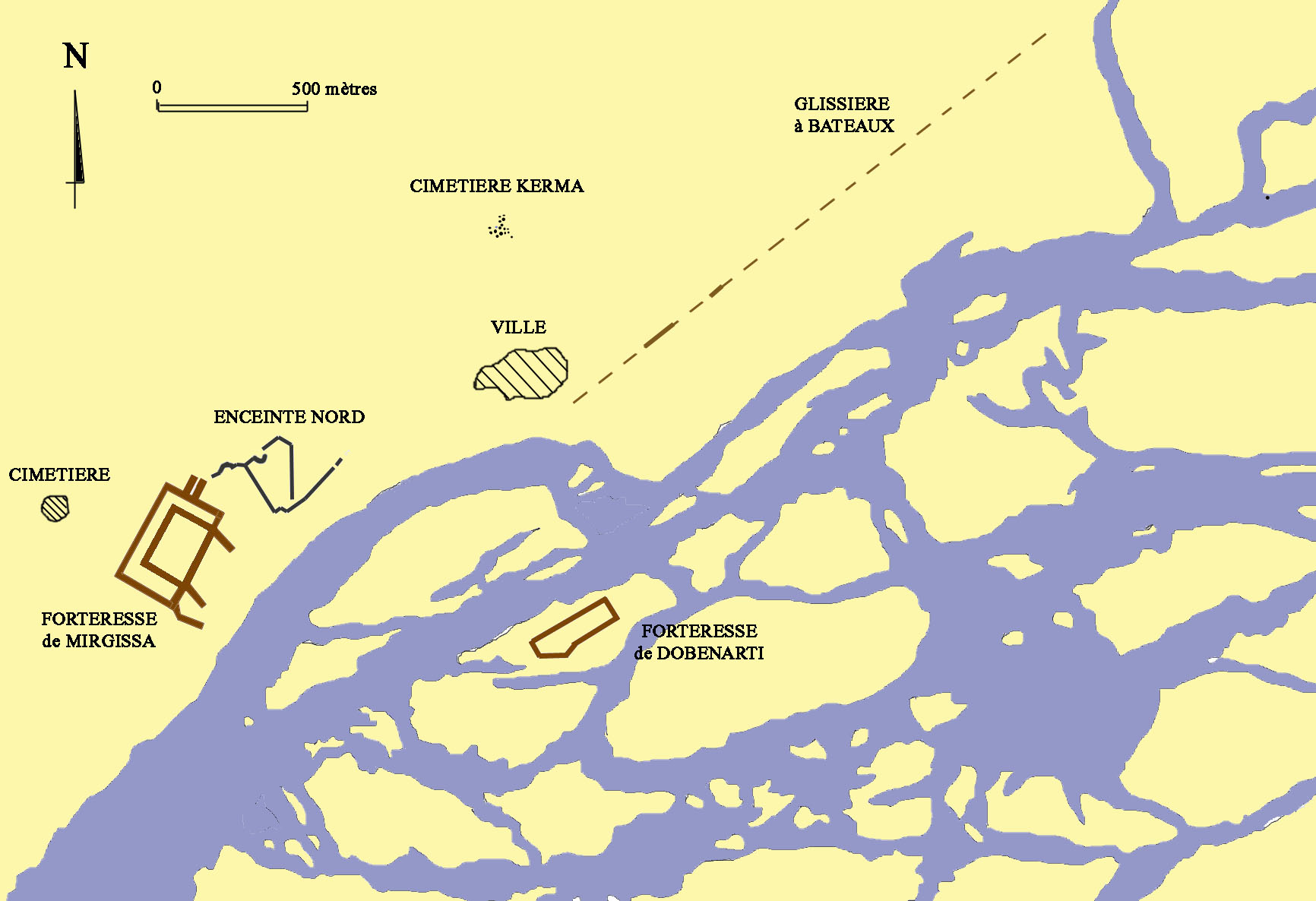
Map of Mirgissa

Mirgissa (originally Iken) was a settlement in Northern state, Sudan. Situated at the 2nd cataract in Wadi Halfa, it contained one of the largest fortresses in Nubia. In the time of Thutmose II, 250 to 450 people inhabited the area. The first European explorer was English geologist Sir Henry George Lyons in 1892, and was excavated without Sudanese permission, by the French Egyptologist Jean Vercoutter from 1962 to 1969. In addition to the fort, excavations uncovered the remains of two cities, one of which was fortified, a northern enclosure, two cemeteries, a boat slide, and a port. Construction of the Aswan High Dam caused the disappearance of Mirgissa, which now lies under the waters of Lake Nubia.

== Geography ==
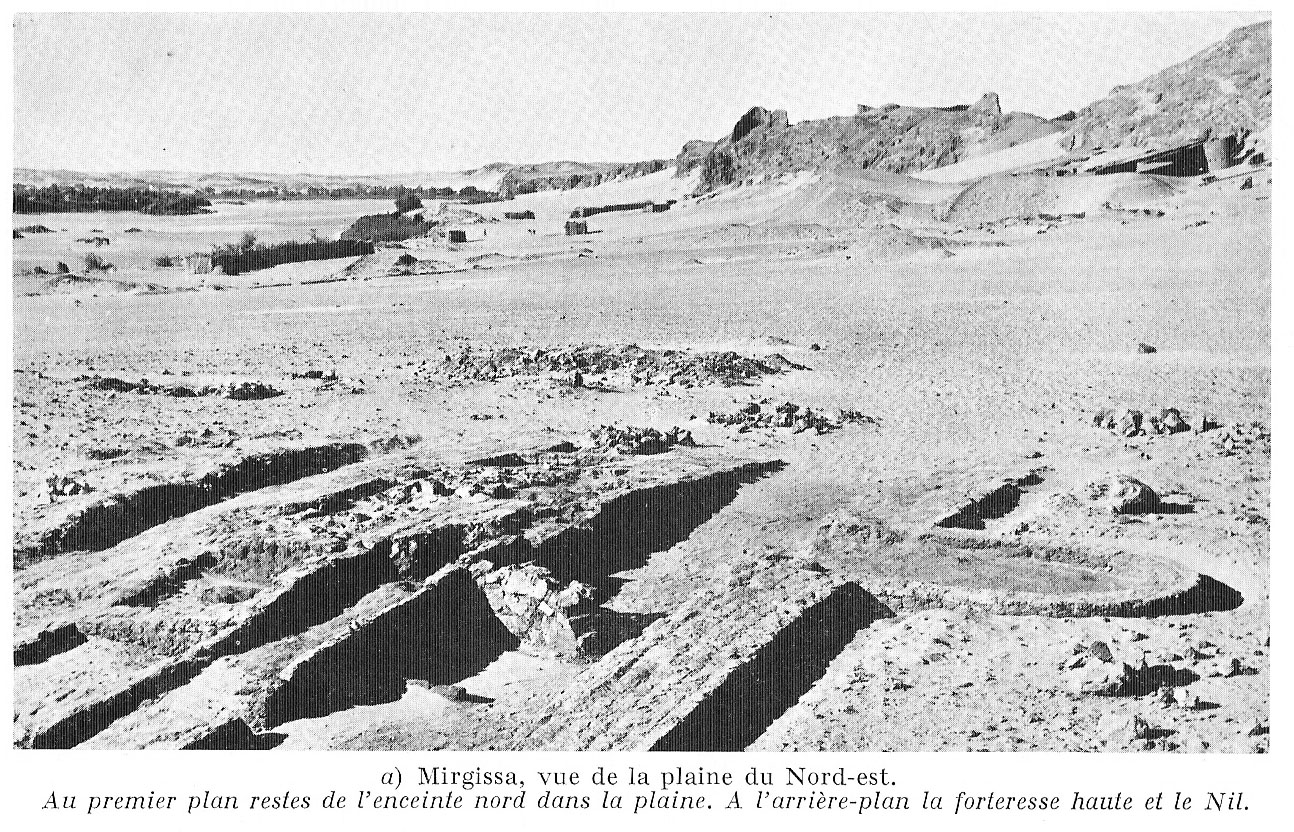
View of the plain to the northeast.

Travelers from the north who reached Abusir had to leave their boats and circumvent the 2nd cataract in order to reach Mirgissa. It was situated 300 feet (91 m) from the harbor, where boats from the south could dock in calm waters, the rapids of the cataract preventing them from continuing their journey further north. Its lofty geographic position allowed sentries to observe the movement of troops for miles around.

== History ==
Even before the great fort, an open town existed at Mirgissa. It went on to become a frontier post and trade center; it also served as a river control point at the 2nd cataract. The occupation of the region dates back to 7500 BCE as shown by the evidence obtained at Akha, an important Mesolithic site located a few hundred meters east of the great fortress. Large stone tools, dating from 3500 BCE, were found in several places of the plain. They demonstrate that Mirgissa was occupied in Neolithic times. But the occupation was at its height during the Middle Kingdom and Second Intermediate Period of ancient Egypt, and to a lesser extent, during the New Kingdom.

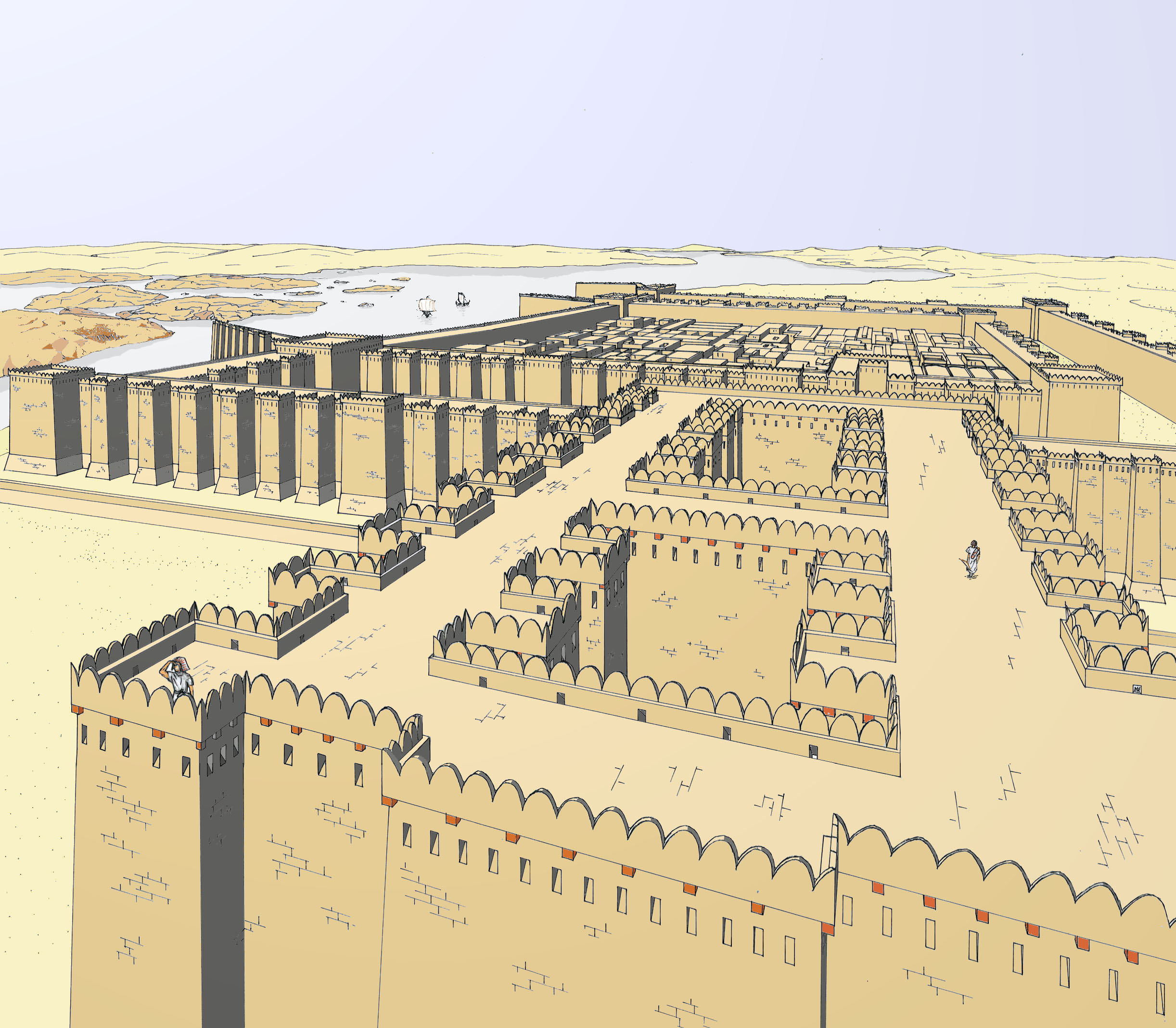
Perspective reconstruction of Mirgissa

While Senusret I probably established the fortification site within the northern enclosure, the great fortress was mainly the work of Senusret III. A stele, dated to year 8 of the reign of Senusret III, was discovered near the fortress of Semna. Its inscription stresses the economic importance of Mirgissa. Its translation reads:

"The southern frontier made in regnal year 8 under the majesty of the King of Upper and Lower Egypt Khakaure (may he live for ever and ever) in order to prevent it being passed by an Nubian journeying north by land or in a kai-boat as well as any livestock belonging to Nubians, with the exception of a Nubian who shall come to traffic at Mirgissa or on an embassy, or on any matter which may lawfully be done with them; but it shall be forbidden for any kai-boat of the Nubians to pass northwards beyond Semna for ever."

During the Twelfth Dynasty, it served as a customs post for travels heading north to Egypt. The periods of most intense occupation date from the Thirteenth Dynasty and then the Hyksos era, as evidenced by the large number of beetles found on the premises. The great fortress was then re-occupied during the Eighteenth Dynasty, followed by a sharp decline until the Twentieth Dynasty. Sporadically occupied at the time Meroitic era, the abandonment of the site was final during the early Christian era.

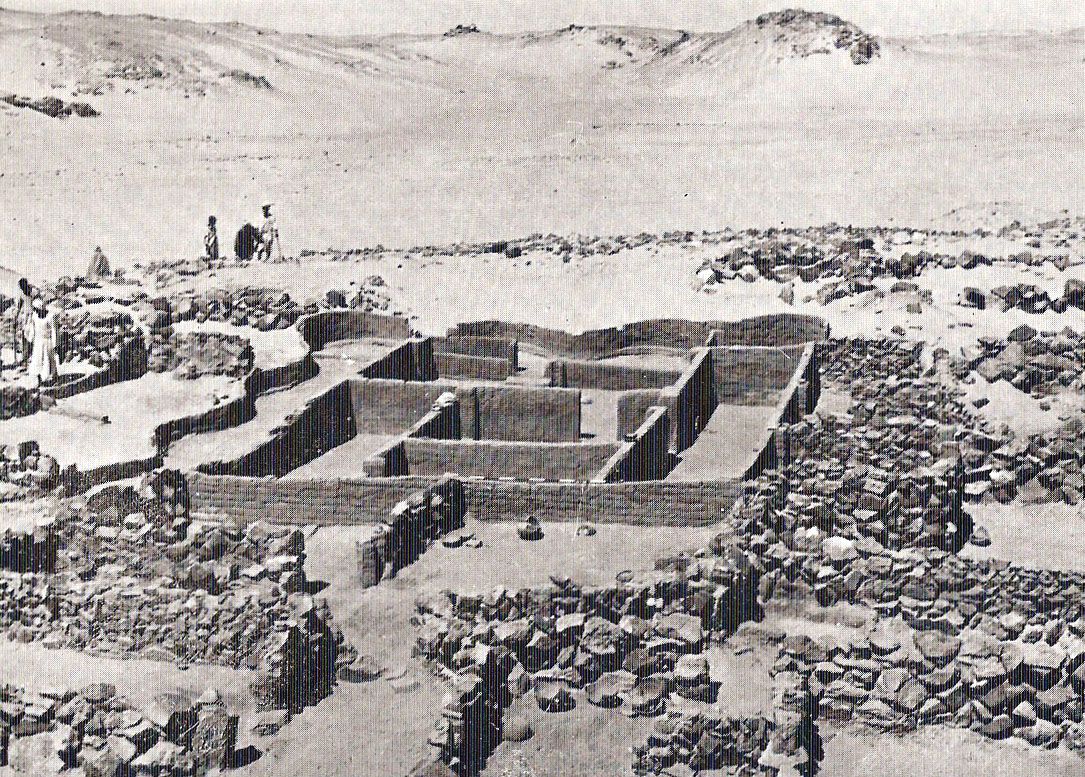
House surrounded by a corrugated wall.

City

Mirgissa's open city predates its fortification. Situated 1 kilometre (0.62 mi) north-northeast of the great fortress, it stretched over a 75,000 square metres (810,000 sq ft) area. In its early development, the city was protected by a stone wall 1 metre (3 ft 3 in) thick, though the residential area later spread outside the walled section. According to various artifacts unearthed at the site, such as jars, millstones, bread molds, beer mugs, and plates, the city appeared to have been occupied by a strictly Egyptian population during the Middle Empire and the Second Intermediate Period. Of the two older excavated houses, the first was surrounded by a rectangular corrugated brick wall, while the second, a stone hut, was mainly rectangular though it contained circular elements.

Cemeteries

The multiple cemeteries at Mirgissa establish a continuous settlement here from the late Middle Kingdom through the New Kingdom:

- M-Fe, late Second Intermediate Period
- M-III, Kerma culture, Second Intermediate Period
- MX, late Middle Kingdom-Second Intermediate Period
- MX-TC, late Twelfth Dynasty-early Thirteenth Dynasty
- MX-TD, first half of the 18th Dynasty

== Fortress ==
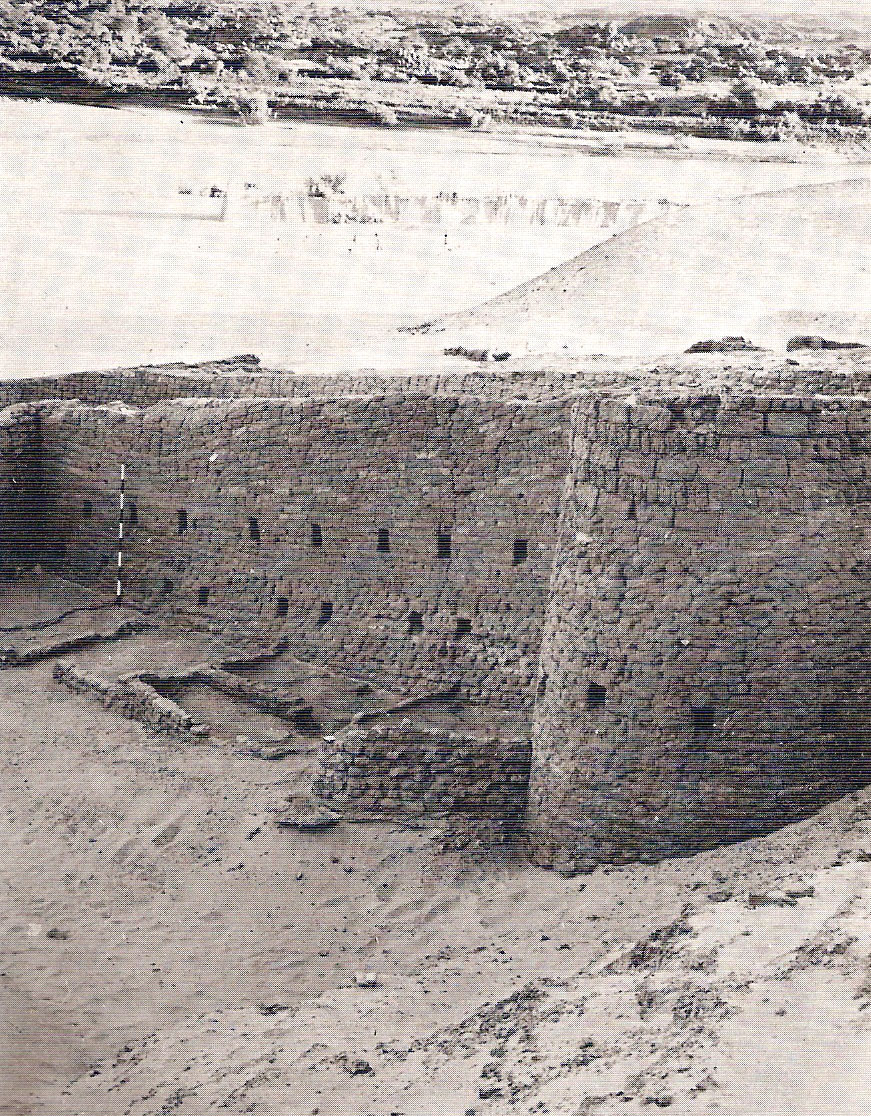
The great fort's wall and towers are examples of Ancient Egyptian architecture.

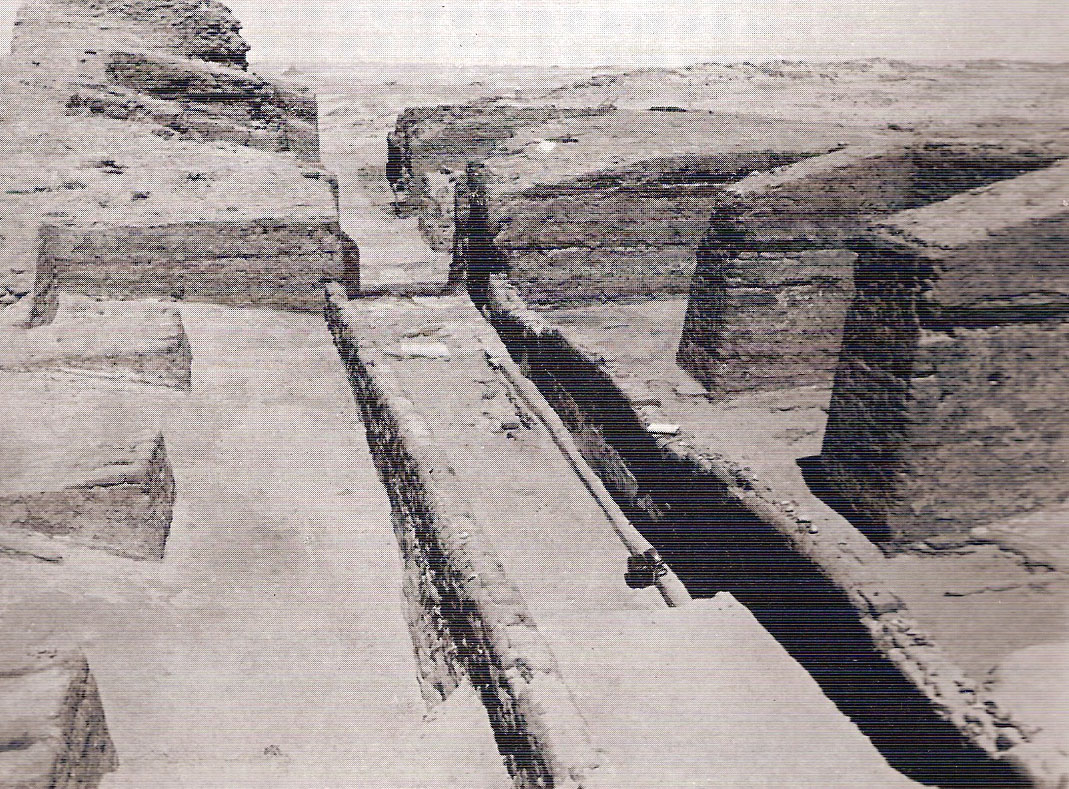
Narrow passage by the north gate of the great fortress.

The great fortress dominated the western Wadi. It was built by the pharaohs of the Middle Kingdom to defend their southern border and control trade routes that passed through the Nile from Sudan and Africa. From a strategic and commercial standpoint, Mirgissa was of importance as it ensured economic exchanges between the Kingdom of Kush and Egypt. Together with Dabenarti, situated on a rocky islet measuring 2.5 square kilometres (0.97 sq mi), the two fortresses formed a barrier to prevent invasions from the south. During excavations, only the foundation remained of the smaller Dabenarti fort, dating from the Twelfth Dynasty, its purpose having been to protect the harbor and dock located at the southern end of The Boat Slide. The great fortress was abandoned during the reign of Neferhotep I.

While eleven forts were built during the reign of Senusret III in the region between the 2nd and 3rd cataracts, including Shalfak, Uronarti, Askut, Semna, Kumma, and Sumna South, Mirgissa was the largest of them. The great fortress covered more than 40,000 square metres (430,000 sq ft). Its double wall with bastions and square-cornered towers, 12 metres (39 ft) high, protected the city. The walls were more than 6 metres (20 ft) thick and over 10 metres (33 ft) high. Both entrances were protected by a ditch. The south side, facing the Nile, was protected by a fortified wall, which perfectly fit the rocky peaks on which it was underpinned. Two enormous gates were flanked to the north and near the southeast corner of the river. The north gate had a narrow passage, its access blocked by two massive wooden doors and a portcullis. Angled bedding-planes enabled the uphill brickwork. Excavations revealed a small temple dedicated to the goddess Hathor and a stele mentioning this goddess as the mistress of Iken; this discovery enabled positive identification of the fortress.

== Port and boat slide ==
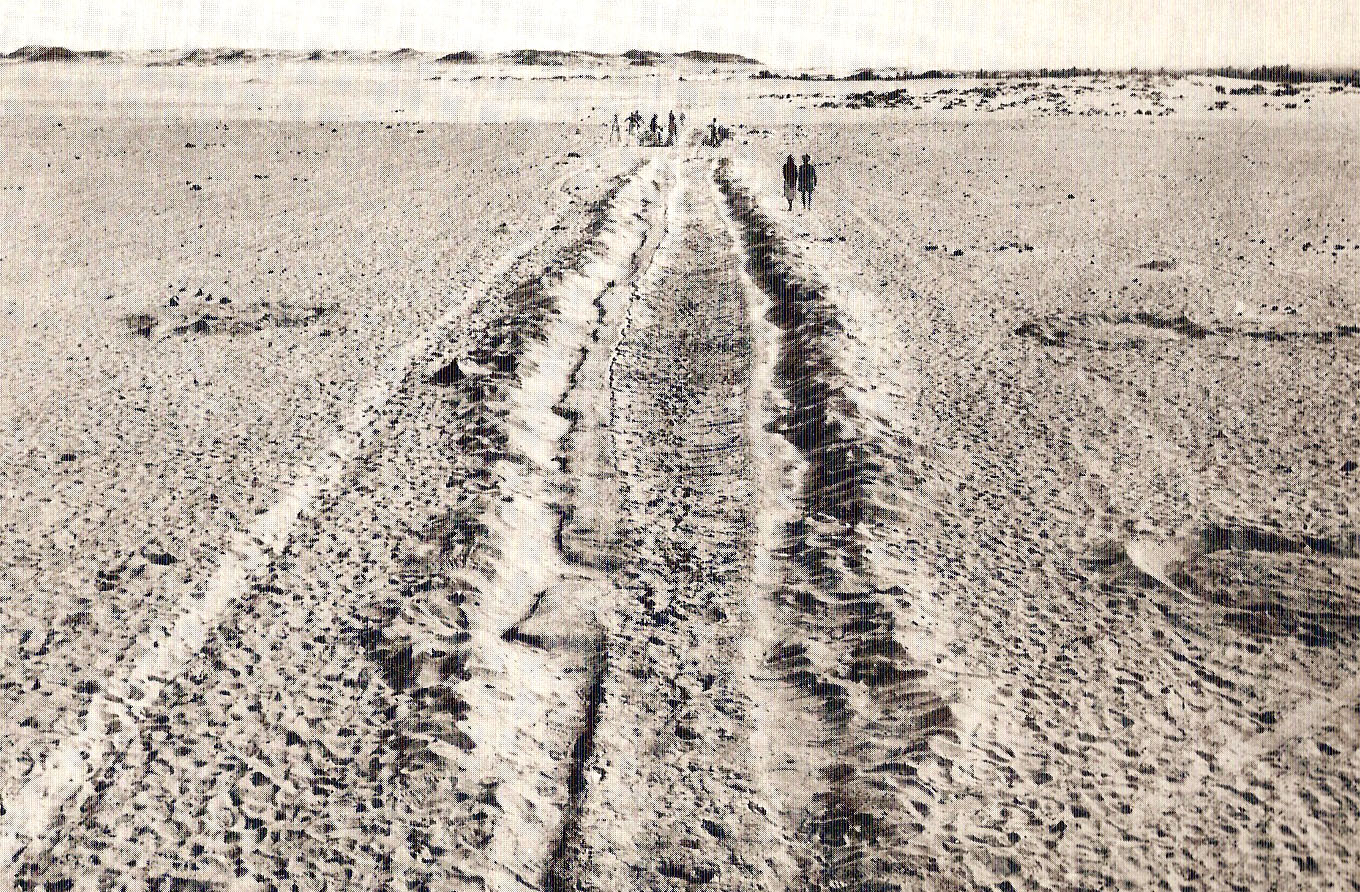
Boat slide

During excavations, few traces of the port were evident, probably due to an exceptional flood. However, the French expedition identified the remains of a boat slipway, over 2 kilometres (1.2 mi) in length. It extended to the natural harbor in the south. It served as a slide for hauling boats who wanted to pass the 2nd cataract. Composed of evenly spaced wooden cross beams set in silt and spread mud layers, it was low enough to wet the clay and make it very slippery, thus reducing friction between the boat hull and the track.

== Archaeological finds ==
The expedition of Jean Vercoutter made a discovery in the surrounding desert, west and not far from the city open, of a grave filled with some 3,500 fragments of pottery sherds; some were inscribed. The Execration texts listed the names of foreign countries and their leaders, their purpose apparently being a form of ritual magic designed to curse the enemies of Egypt. It is highly likely that once the text was written on a vase, it was broken and its fragments buried in the grave. Near this place, three statues dating from the Twelfth Dynasty were also unearthed, as well as a seal from Nebiryraw I of the Sixteenth Dynasty.

== See also ==
- List of Egyptian castles, forts, fortifications and city walls
