= Shalfak =

Archaeological site in Sudan

Coordinates: 21°32′30″N 31°2′25″E

Shalfak in hieroglyphs
G43 D36 I9 A24 N25 X1 Ba15 Z2 Ba15a
Waf-Chastiu
Wʾf-ḫ3s.wt

Shalfak is an Ancient Egyptian fortress once built up on the western shore of the Second Cataract of the Nile River on what is now an island in Lake Nubia, Lake Nasser in the north of Sudan.

== History ==
Set up in the Middle Kingdom under Senusret III, Shalfak is one of a chain of 17 forts which the pharaohs of the 12th Dynasty established to secure their southern frontier during a time when they sought to expand Egypt's influence. Shalfak, along with the forts of Buhen, Mirgissa, Uronarti, Askut, Dabenarti, Semna, and Kumma, were established within signalling distance of each other.

== Description ==
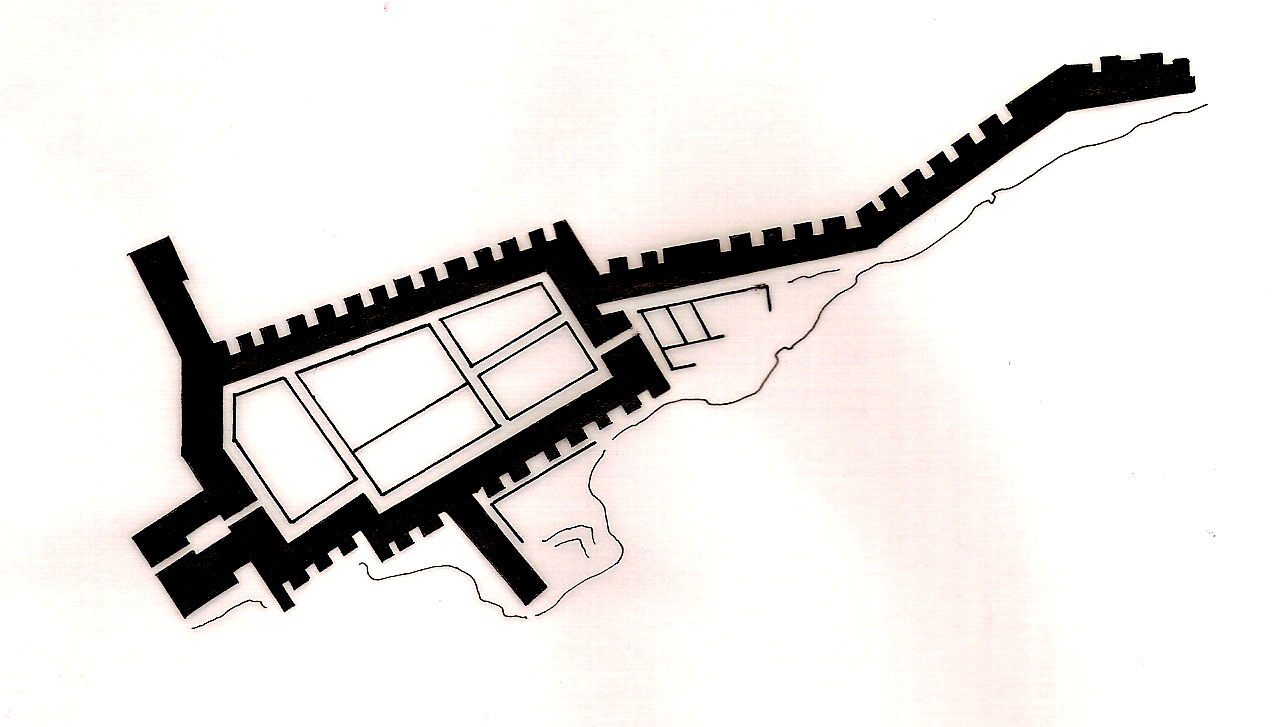
Situation plan of Shalfak

The fortress occupies a roughly triangular area of about 1,800 square metres (0.44 acres), adapted to the available ground. Its massive mudbrick wall still stands up to 6 metres (20 ft) high and 8 metres (26 ft) thick. Three spur walls, towards the north, west and east, complete the fortification system. The eastern wall protects a stairway leading down to the river to ensure access to a water supply in the case of siege. The internal structures are very well preserved, including a command building, barracks, workshops, storerooms and a granary arranged in a grid plan.

== Excavations ==
Excavations were conducted in February and March 1931 by a team of the Harvard University and the Museum of Fine Arts Boston under Noel F. Wheeler. In 2017, a team under Claudia Näser from University College London began excavating again, with excavations ongoing as of 2018.

== Bibliogrophy ==
- Dunham, Dows (1967). Second Cataract Forts, Volume II: Uronarti, Shalfak, Mirgissa. Boston: Museum of Fine Arts.
- Näser, Claudia (2018). "Shalfak: A Middle Kingdom Fortress in Lake Nubia". Egyptian Archaeology, 52, pp. 4–9.
- Näser, Claudia; Becker, Peter; Kossatz, Kay; and Karrar, Osman Khaleel Elawad (2017). "Shalfak Archaeological Mission (SAM): The 2017 Field Season". The Journal of Egyptian Archaeology, 103(2), pp. 153–171.
- Davies, W. Vivian (2021). "An Inscribed Basin of the 18th Dynasty (Reign of Amenhotep III) from the Fortress of Shalfak in Lower Nubia". Sudan & Nubia, 25, pp. 1–10.
- Mills, A. J., and Nordström, H.-Å. (1966). "The Archaeological Survey from Gemai to Dal: Preliminary Report of the Season 1964–65". Kush, 14, pp. 1–15.
- Vogel, Carola (2004). Ägyptische Festungen und Garnisonen bis zum Ende des Neuen Reiches. Hildesheim: Gerstenberg.
