= Uronarti =

Archaeological site in Northern State, Sudan

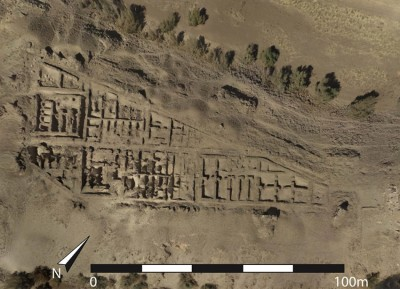
- Uronarti.

- Location within Sudan
- 21°31′33″N 30°59′25″E
- Type: Fortress
- Location: Northern, Sudan
- Region: Middle Kingdom

Uronarti is an island and archaeological site in the Nile just south of the Second Cataract in the north of Sudan. The site features a massive ancient fortress that still stands on its northern end. This fortress is one of many constructed along the Nile in Lower Nubia during the Middle Kingdom, beginning under the reign of Senusret I.

This site was thought to be submerged under Lake Nasser, however parts remain above water and recently seen the establishment of new archaeological projects. The discoveries of the project include an extramural settlement contemporary with the fortress, called Site FC, and further details on the settlement itself.

== Archaeological research ==
Uronarti has been researched for over 100 years. Uronarti was first excavated by British archaeologist Noel F. Wheeler under the nominal supervision of George Andrew Reisner in 1924. The results of these excavations were published by Dows Dunham.

After the Aswan High Dam was built, it believed that this site was submerged under Lake Nasser. Recently, the fortress was recently rediscovered by Derek Welsby. In 2012, the Uronarti Regional Archaeology Project (URAP) was formed by Dr Laurel Bestock and Dr Christian Knoblauch to investigate Uronarti. The project, which is ongoing, focuses on colonial relations and the lived experience of ancient people on Uronarti and in the surrounding region.

== Fortress ==
The triangular shaped fortress of Uronarti is situated high on a rocky island, where it took advantage of the narrow passage of the Nile River in an area with the modern name Batn-El-Hajar - the Belly of Rocks. Conforming closely to the topography, the fort is an example of the Terrain type of Middle Kingdom forts. It was largely constructed of sun-dried mud brick.

The initial mapping of Uronarti was completed by Dows Dunham. The interior of the fortress has streets paved with stone. Sections of the fort include large granaries, buildings thought to be an administrative center, a governor's house, and barracks. The barracks are similar in plan to small houses known at other Middle Kingdom settlements that were planned by the state Many of the buildings inside the fortress saw substantial modifications over time, indicating shifts in both social life and administration. The ceramics from dumps at Uronarti suggest an occupation history into the very late Middle Kingdom or very early Second Intermediate Period, but not beyond.

Aside from the architecture itself, the overwhelming majority of archaeological finds from Uronarti fortress are ceramics.

Some other items found at Uronarti include seal impressions, mud stamps, pottery, papyrus fragments, and stelae. Most papyrus fragments include only a few characters, and while they are thus largely illegible, they attest to the high level of documentation of the administrative activities of the fortress (see the Semna Despatches for better preserved records of this type of activity). The large number of sealings reflects administrative activities, and can track changes in leadership through the fort's use.

=== Site FC ===
Site FC is an site some 250m south of the walls of the fortress. Discovered in 2012 and partly excavated in 2013 and 2015, it is significantly different from the fort although it appears to be contemporary with it. Occupying two low hills near the current east shore of the island, the site consists of the remains of at least 25 dry-stone huts constructed of local stone. Some huts were single rooms, some more elaborate groupings of rooms.

One excavated hut had a hearth and a windbreak protecting large storage vessels. This site was most likely contemporary with the early phase of the occupation of the fortress.

=== The "Campaign Palace" ===
In addition to the fortress, Uronarti had some other mud brick constructions, the largest of which was a rectangular building that is discussed in scholarly literature as the "Campaign Palace". Before the construction of Lake Nasser, this rectangular building was interpreted as a palace that the king could have stayed at while on campaign. However, there is little evidence to support this analysis. We can see this is a larger building than others, and that could have indicated status. Unfortunately, this area is annually flooded, so studying it can be difficult. The URAP conducted studies at low water to see how much of the "palace" remained, but results were inconclusive.

=== Exterior wall ===
A massive boundary wall runs the length of the exterior, and extends several hundred meters to the south toward the Semna fortress.

== Boundary stela of Senusret III ==
A near-duplicate of the text of the Semna stela of Senusret III was found at Uronarti by Georg Steindorf, Ludwig Borchardt and H. Schäfer. The inscription states that Senusret III was victorious over a Nubian army, however it is not clear what in this record is militaristic propaganda, and what is recounting of historical events. A discussion, transcription, and translation were published by J. Janssen. The stela is currently housed in the National Museum of Sudan.

== Similar sites ==
Many similar fortresses, such as Buhen, Mirgissa, Shalfak, Askut, Dabenarti, Semna, and Kumma, were established within signaling distance of each other. Most of the fortresses are now beneath Lake Nasser, however aerial surveillance has provided recent views of these sites.

== Bibliogrophy ==
- Reisner, George A. (1929). "Ancient Egyptian Forts at Semna and Uronarti". Bulletin of the Museum of Fine Arts, 27, pp. 64–75.
- Reisner, George A. (1955). "Clay Sealings of Dynasty XIII from Uronarti Fort". Kush, 3, pp. 26–69.
- Dunham, Dows (1967). Second Cataract Forts, Volume II: Uronarti, Shalfak, Mirgissa. Boston: Museum of Fine Arts.
- Bestock, Laurel, and Christian Knoblauch (2014). "Revisiting Middle Kingdom Interactions in Nubia: The Uronarti Regional Archaeological Project". Journal of Ancient Egyptian Interconnections, 6(4), pp. 32–35.
- Bestock, Laurel, and Christian Knoblauch (2015). "Living beyond the Walls: New Evidence for Egyptian Colonialism at Uronarti, Nubia". Antiquity, 89(344).
- Bestock, Laurel (2017). "Forgotten Fortress: Returning to Uronarti". Near Eastern Archaeology, 80(3), pp. 154–165.
- Knoblauch, Christian, and Laurel Bestock (2017). "Evolving Communities: The Egyptian Fortress on Uronarti in the Late Middle Kingdom". Sudan and Nubia, 21, pp. 50–58.
- Levine, Evan; Rothenberg, Miriam; Siegel, Oren; Knoblauch, Christian; Bestock, Laurel; and Klein, Lutz (2019). "The Uronarti Regional Archaeological Project: Second Cataract Fortresses and the Western Desert of Sudan". Antiquity, 93(372).
- Bestock, Laurel, and Christian Knoblauch. "Leather, Mud and Grain: The 2018 Excavations in Uronarti Fortress". Uronarti Regional Archaeological Project excavation report.

== See also ==
- Buhen
- Mirgissa
- Shalfak
- Askut
- Dabenarti
- Semna
- Kumma
- Semna Dispatches
