= Semna Despatches =

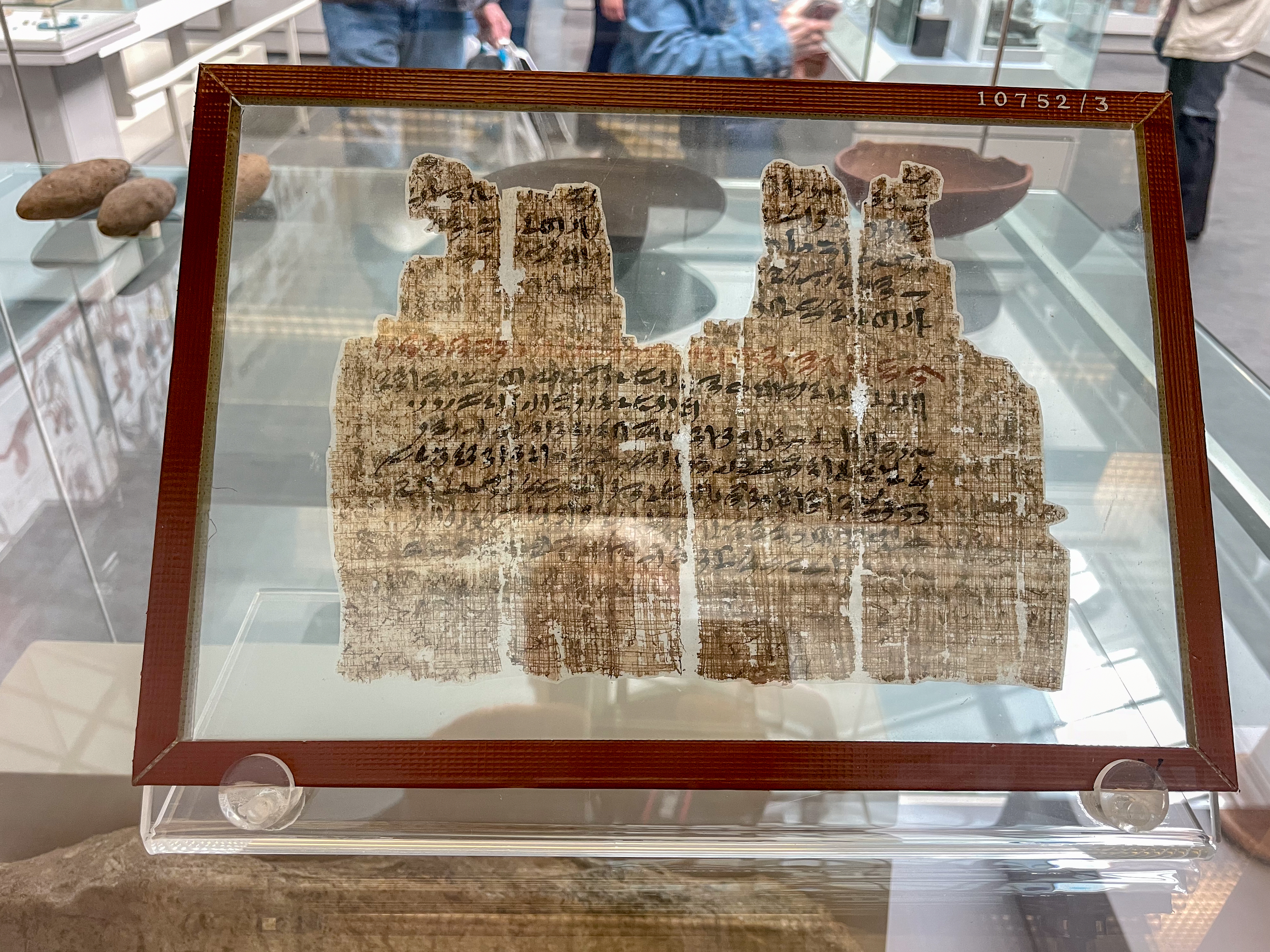
Example of the Semna Despatches at the British Museum

The Semna Despatches are a group of papyri that deals with observations of people in and around the forts of the Semna gorge. The fortresses were positioned at Semna because of the expansion of Egypt into Lower Nubia by Senusret III, and were a means of protecting and controlling access into Egypt. The Semna Despatches record the movements of people around the Semna Gorge, and reports their activity to an unnamed official in Thebes. Many of the Despatches deal with people who had come to the forts to trade with the Egyptians while others talk about patrols that had gone out and found people in the surrounding desert. The Semna Despatches provides the bulk of information that pertains to the administrative functions of the forts around the Semna Gorge.

The Semna Despatches form one of very few records that tell us about what the forts around the Semna Gorge did, and what life was like in the forts. These Despatches are therefore very important to us historically, and give us a glimpse into the forts. The Despatches also provide a look at the Egyptian attitude toward the people of Nubia to the south as they record the interactions between Egyptians and Nubians. These Despatches are now housed in the British Museum.

The Semna Despatches are now part of the British Museums collection; after being gifted by Alan Gardiner who had acquired them around 1900 in return for his financial help with preservation and publishing the papyri. The collection is cataloged as AE10752.1, AE10752.2, AE1075.3, AE10752.4, AE10752.5, AE10771.1, AE10771.2, AE10772.2. Unfortunately, two of the Despatches suffered significant damage from the use of cellulose nitrate film with both of the papyri being seriously damaged

== Semna Forts ==
During the reign of Senusret I the Egyptians started to push further south into lower Nubia and by the reign of Senusret III it became necessary to build forts around Semna Gorge; this area would provide a defensive position in case of attack by Nubia, who were still a powerful enemy. The forts also served a second purpose which was to control access into Egypt. The people whom they were trying to keep out were Nubians as you can clearly see in the boundary stela of Senusret III which speaks of the Nubians as a wretched vile people. To accomplish the task of keeping the Nubians out the Egyptians would send patrols into the desert to find people who may be trying to cross the border clandestinely and report those movements to the other forts as well as to officials in Thebes which is the main reason the Semna Despatches were created. Nubian's Egyptian attitudes towards Nubians was based more on stereotypes and religious feeling than actual facts. The Egyptians saw the outside world as one being of disorder which must be controlled to preserve Maat (or order) with this extending to outside country's particularly Nubia. Because the Egyptians saw Nubia as disordered its people were considered disordered and therefore it was good to destroy and control them as we see in the Boundary Stela of Senusret III. We can see in the Semna Despatches the Egyptians upholding Maat by keeping the Nubians out.

== Discovery ==
The Semna Despatches were found in a Theban tomb which was below the Mortuary Temple of Ramesses II by J.E.Quibell in 1895–1896. The Despatches were found in a wooden box in a very poor state of decomposition with estimates that around two thirds of the Papyri having been already lost when Quibell found them. The Despatches suffered another mishap as when they were being hoisted out of the tomb they fell from the basket back down the shaft potentially damaging more of the already fragile papyri. After Quibell got them back to England they sat on a shelf in the Edwards Library at University College, London until they were given to the esteemed Egyptologist Alan Gardiner to preserve and publish around 1900.

== Translation ==
The Job of translating the Semna Despatches fell to Paul C. Smithers who worked on them in early 1940 until his death in 1943. Unfortunately, because it was war time, and because Smithers died in September 1943 from a lingering illness he was unable to consult the original plates containing the Semna Despatches so instead he worked from photographs. Because of the difficulty in working from photographs, Smithers encountered some errors in translation resolved by Bryan Kraemer and Dr Kate Liszka in 2016. Kraemer and Liszka also made a translation of two separate papyri found with the Semna Despatches which also related to the Semna Forts. Unlike the Semna Despatches which dealt with monitoring the movements of people around the Semna Gorge these papyri dealt with administration and talk about the inspection of officials in the fort of Elephantine.

=== Paul C. Smithers ===
==== [page 1] ====
...(x+1) wrote...troop(?)... (2) found his(?)...had done (or made) It...Then...in month 4 of [prõyet, day] ... (3) ...[caused?] food to go down to him...

He wrote about it to this servant... (4) this servant wrote...the track which this servant ...ed in [year 3 month 4 of prõyet, day] 7, (5) [at] the time of evening. Then...inform him.

[They] reported [to this servant,] (6) saying, ‘We found the…Nubian [women had gone(?) in] Charge of(?) two strong(?) asses… (7) These Nubian women… [the fortress:] (the-late) Khakawrē-is-mighty. [X(?)] Nubians {arrived(?) in year] 3, (8) month 4 of prõyet, day 7,

[at] the time of ev[ening,] to do trade. What [they] brought was traded… (9) the trading Thereof. (They) sailed up-stream to the place whence they had come, bread and beer having been

Given to them like… in year 3, month 4 of prõyet, day 8, at the time of morning. It is a communication about it. All the affairs of (11) of the King’s Domain, L.P.H., are safe and Sound; all the affairs of the Master, L.P.H., are safe and sound. May the hearing of the Master,

L.P.H., be good!

=== Paul C. Smithers ===
==== [page 2] ====
…(x+1) … (illegible traces) … (2) on the track’-so [he(?)] said... brought With regard to(?) it. [This] servant [wrote]... (3) five guardsmen who(?)... the tract.

This servant placed them upon... (4) (when?) this servant writes...(when?) they come to Report[to]... (5) this servant because of it, regarding these... as one fortress sending to

Another fortress.

[It is a] communication [because of it]. (6) All the affairs of the King's [Domain L.P.H, are

safe] and sound; all the affairs of the Master, [L.P.H, are safe and sound].

=== Paul C. Smithers ===
(7) ANOTHER LETTER WHICH WAS BROUGHT TO HIM, BEING ONE BROUGHT FROM LASHANE SEBK-WĒR, WHO IS IN YEĶEN(?), (8) AS ONE FORTRESS SENDING TO ANOTHER FORTRESS.

(9) It is a communication to your scribe, L.P.H., about the fact that those two guardsmen and

Seventy(?) Medjay-people (10) who went following that track in month 4 of prõyet, day 4, came

to report to me on this day (11) at the time of evening, having brought three Medjay-men,

...four.., (12) saying, “We found them on the south of the desert-edge, below the

Inscription of Shōmu, (13) likewise three women(??)’-so said they. Then I questioned these

Medjay-people, saying, ‘Whence have you come?’ Then they said, ‘We have come from the Well of Yebheyet

==== [page 3] ====
…(x+1) the… (2) month 4 of prõyet, day…, came to report [to]…he Said regarding… (3) I went upon (or from?) the [track?] …explained(?)…the…

Brought him… (4) the patrol(?). Then I came… [-so said he?]. I wrote about them (5)

To the fortresses to the North. [All the affairs of the King’s] Domain, l.p.h., are safe and sound; (6) all the affairs of your scribe,

[l.p.h., are safe and sound]. May the hearing of the your scribe, l.[p.]h., be good!

=== Paul C. Smithers ===
(7) ANOTHER LETTER WHICH WAS BROUGHT TO HIM FROM THE RETAINER AMENY, WHO IS IN (THE

FORTRESS) KHESEF-MEDJA’EW, AS ONE FORTRESS SENDING TO ANOTHER FORTRESS.

(8) It is a communication to the Master, l.p.h., about the fact that

The guardsman of Hieraconpolis(?), Senēw’s son Herew’s son Reniyokre, and

(9) the guardsman of Tjebew, Rensi’s son Senwosret’s son ditto,

(10) came to report to this servant in year 3, month 4 of Prōyet, day 2, at the time of breakfast, (11)

On business of the citizen, Khewsobk’s son Mentuhotpe’s son Khewsobk…, (12) who

represented the Beneficiary of the Ruler’s Table in the troop of Meha’, saying, The patrol(?)

who went forth (13) to patrol(?) the desert-edge... the fortress Khesef-Medja’ew in year 3, month 3 of prōyet, last day, (14) have come to report to me, saying, We have found the track of 32 men and three asses, (which?) they have trodden

==== [page 4] ====
... (x+1...(traces).... (2) ...the patrol(?)...myplaces’-so said(?) [he?]

.... (3) ...order(?) of the troop.... (4) on the desert-edge. This servant wrote [about it To] ... [as one fortress sending to another] (5) fortress.

It is a communication [about] it. [all the affairs of the King's Domain(?),] l.p.h., are safe [and

Sound]

=== Paul C. Smithers ===
(6) COPY OF A DOCUMENT WHICH WAS BROUGHT TO HIM, BEING ONE BROUGHT FROM THE FORTRESS

[OF] ELEPHANTINE, AS ONE FORTRESS SENDING TO ANOTHER FORTRESS.

(7) Be informed, if you please, of the fact that two Medjay-men, three Medjay-women, and two

... (8) came down from the desert in year 3, month 3 of Prōyet, day 27; they said, ‘We have come

To serve (9) the Great House, l.p.h. A question was put regarding the condition of the desert.

Then they said, We have heard nothing at all; (10) (but) the desert is dying of hunger’-so said

They. Then this servant caused that (they) be dismissed to their desert (11) on this day. Then one of

These Medjay-women said, ‘O let me be given (12) my Medjay-man in this(?) … Then that Medjay-man [said], ‘Does on who trades bring himself?’(?)

=== Paul C. Smithers ===
==== [page 5] ====
.... (x+1,2) ... (illegible signs) ...

(3) [it is a communication to the Master,] l.p.h., [about the fact that] the first (or chief?) [of the]

...reported... (4) in [year 3, month 4 of] prōyet, day 8, at the time [of] morning,

Saying, ... (5) ....is (or are) going to see me. I found ...

(6) It is a communication about it. All the affairs of the King's Domain, l.p.h., are safe and sound];

(7) all the affairs of the Master, l.p.h., are safe and sound. May the hearing of [the Master, l.p.h.,] be good! (8) AN ACKNOWLEDGEMENT OF THE THIS LETTER HAS BEEN MADE IN A LETTER WHICH HAS BEEN

SENT TO HIM ABOUT THE ... NUBIANS (9) WHO ARRIVED AT THE FORTRESS ‘(THE-LATE-) KHA’KAWRE-IS-

MIGHTY’ IN MONTH 4 OF PRŌYET, DAY 7, AT THE TIME OF EVENING, (10) AND WERE SENT BACK [TO]

THE PLACE WHENCE THEY HAD COME IN MONTH 4 OF PRŌYET, DAY 8, AT THE TIME OF MORNING.

(11) COPIED IN A LETTER WHICH HAS BEEN SENT TO:

THE JUDGE, MOUTH OF HIERACONPOLIS, SIMONTU, WHO IS [IN YETN]EW?...;

(12) THE CITY-ADMINISTRATOR AMENY, WHO IS ...;

(13) THE HIGH STEWARD SENIMERI, [WHO IS IN] ....

=== Bryan Kraemer, Dr. Kate Liszka ===
(x+1) [... the serv]ant-[there...]

(x+2) [...] They came after [...in regnal year 3, month 4 of peret, day 7 or 8?]

(x+3) [at the time] of morning. [They said, “It is in order to do trade that we have come.” So they said...]

(x+4) A payment for it was given to them. [according to the rule on this day. All the matters of the royal

House, l.p.h.]

(x+6) are safe and sound. [All matters of the master, l.p.h.,] are safe and sound. [it is good that the master, l.p.h., listens.]

(x+7) Assigned to ‘nh-n-niw.t Rens [?’s son? …’s son..] emhat in cross[ing? to…]

=== Bryan Kraemer, Dr. Kate Liszka ===
(x+8) Copy of a document sent to the Ꜣtw-[(n)-niw.t, Amen]y who is in the fortress opposing-[the-lunu (Uronarti)]

(x+9) It is a communication to the master, l. [p.h., that] 4 Nehesy-women arrived at [the fortress Khakaure-true-of]-voice-[is-mighty (Semna West)]

(x+10) in regnal year 3, month 4 of Peret, day [ 6 at the time of] morning. They Said, “It is to do trade that we have come.” So they said.

(x+11) What they brought was traded. A payment for it [was given to them.]

They went south [to the place] that they came from

(x+12) [on] day 7 at the time of [evening], after bread and beer were [given to] Them according [to the rule]. It is a communication about it.

(x+13) The servant-there had the High [steward] Senmeri who is in the fortress Repelling-the-bows (Kumma) bring [it.]

=== Bryan Kraemer, Dr. Kate Liszka ===
(x+1) [Copy of...that...brought from...]

(x+2) by [fortress giving to fortress:]

(x+3) [it is a] communication [to your scribe, l.p.h., that...]

(x+4) that [...]

(x+5) of [...]

(x+6) for?? [...]

== Conservation ==
Given the poor state of preservation the Semna Despatches were in when they were discovered, it was inevitable that they would need to be preserved. Alan Gardiner funded the preservation with Hugo Ibscher doing the actual preservation work which was begun in 1903 and lasted until around 1939. Ibscher used several different methods for preserving the papyri which included attaching them to cellulose nitrate film, gelatin film, and cardboard then sandwiching them between glass. Unfortunately, the use of celluloid nitrate film can be very unstable and in the case of two of the papyri burning has been caused because of its use. Fortunately, only the two damaged papyri were found to contain celluloid nitrate film with the rest being gelatin film that is far more stable. The way the preserved papyri were mounted has caused damage however. Because the papyri were mounted in-between two sheets of glass when the frame is moved the papyrus moves slightly causing damage. To stop further damage the British Museum started in 2006 to remove the frames and the gelatin film then remount the papyrus to fine tissue paper to ensure their continued preservation. This recent preservation could only be carried out on some of the papyri however as the adhesive used on the others, Celluloid nitrate adhesive, is very difficult to remove and because of the papyrus’ already fragile state the British museum decided to not try and remount those.
