= Das wissenschaftliche Bibellexikon im Internet =

Das wissenschaftliche Bibellexikon im Internet (short WiBiLex; transl. The Scientific Bible Dictionary on the Internet) is a digital encyclopedia in the field of biblical studies that has been operated by the German Bible Society (DBG) since May 2007. The aim of the project is to provide a scholarly sound yet freely accessible source of information on central topics of the Old and New Testaments. The encyclopedia is primarily aimed at an academic audience.

== Origins, content, concept, orientation, and structure ==
WiBiLex was founded in 2007 by Klaus Koenen and is edited by Michaela Bauks and Michael Pietsch for the Old Testament and by Stefan Alkier for the New Testament. In addition, more than twenty subject editors are involved in the editorial work. Since WiBiLex originally began as a project exclusively devoted to the Old Testament and the systematic expansion to the second part of the Christian canon took place only several years later, the two project areas are largely developed independently of one another; overarching editorial coordination has so far not been established. As a result of this project structure, entries dealing with identical lemmata do not necessarily refer to one another.

The articles are written exclusively by scholars who are demonstrably qualified through their particular academic expertise and relevant publications in the respective field, and they address biblical books, persons, places, key concepts, themes of theology and the history of religion, as well as questions of reception history and cultural studies. To date, approximately 2,000 articles by about 600 authors have been published—predominantly on the Old Testament. The intended final scope comprises roughly 3,000 entries.

Each article follows a clear internal structure and concludes with a bibliography. Footnotes are not used, while APA-style in-text citations are employed to varying degrees from article to article. The entries are updated regularly and reflect the current state of research. Hyperlinks establish cross-references between individual articles as well as direct links to biblical passages, which can be consulted in different Bible translations. In this way, WiBiLex integrates the classical systematic organization of a lexicon into the logic of digital hypertext.

In terms of its scholarly orientation and its commitment to academic precision, WiBiLex stands in the tradition of large-scale theological reference works such as the Theologische Realenzyklopädie, the Reallexikon für Antike und Christentum, or Religion in Geschichte und Gegenwart, while at the same time distinguishing itself through its consistently digital and open format. It is conceived as a specialist resource addressed equally to students and scholars of theology, clergy, and teachers of religious education.

The encyclopedia constitutes an integral component of the internet platform bibelwissenschaft.de, which also provides access to further scholarly projects, including the religious-educational WiReLex and the freely accessible, peer-reviewed e-journal Die Bibel in der Kunst.
