= Louis Vico Žabkar =

Louis Vico Žabkar (7 December 1914 – 15 September 1994) was an American Egyptologist who published a number of academic works and who participated in the 1960s in the UNESCO campaign to salvage the monuments threatened by the building of the Aswan Dam.

Louis Žabkar was born on the Dalmatian island of Lastovo, which was then part of Italy. He was born to a Slovenian father, Lieutenant Louis Franz Žabkar, who was stationed on the island, and Italian mother, Maria Carminatti. He immigrated to the United States in 1948.

He had eight years of classical studies at the classical gymnasium of Split, Yugoslavia and obtained master's degrees in Oriental history and languages from the Pontifical Biblical and Oriental Institute in Rome. He had mastery of German, French, Italian, Serbo-Croatian, ancient Greek and Latin, Egyptian, Coptic and Hebrew.

He received his Ph.D. in 1958 from the University of Chicago. After teaching in the history department of Loyola University Chicago and serving as Field Egyptologist for the Oriental Institute Expeditions to Egyptian and Sudanese Nubia, he became Field Director of The Oriental Institute Expedition to Semna South (1966–67, 1968) which excavated an ancient Egyptian Middle Kingdom Fortress and one of the largest Meroitic cemeteries.

In 1969, he became Professor of Egyptology in the Department of Mediterranean Studies at Brandeis University. He taught graduate courses in Egyptology and Nubian Studies, and retired in 1984 as the Joseph and Esther Foster Professor of Classical and Oriental Studies.

In 1976, during the UNESCO funded dismantling of monuments of the Island of Philae for reassembly on a higher adjacent island, he was able to photograph the earliest hymns to Isis in her temple just before it was dismantled. Later, in his book Hymns to Isis in her Temple at Philae, he edited and published the first translation of these hymns.

His interests and published works include Egyptian religion, Egyptian and Nubian archaeology, Ptolemaic language and history. See also his eulogy in the Journal of Near Eastern Studies.

His 1968 book on the concept of the ba in Ancient Egypt was the first in depth study of the subject. His Book on The Hymns to Isis in Her Temple at Philae was the first editing and translation of the earliest hymns to Isis.

Žabkar died in 1994 in Rockport, Massachusetts.

== Select bibliography ==
- Ausgrabungen von Khor-Dehmit bis Bet el-Wali (1967, contributor)
- A Study of the Ba Concept in Ancient Egyptian Texts (1968)
- Studies in Honor of John A. Wilson (1969, contributor)
- Apedemak: Lion God of Meroe: A Study in Egyptian-Meroitic Syncretism (1975)
- A Preliminary Report on the 1966-68 Excavations of the University of Chicago Oriental Institute Expedition to Sudanese Nubia JNES XIX (1982) (co-author: Joan Zabkar)
- Hymns to Isis in her temple at Philae (1988)
