= Askut =

Ancient Egyptian island fortress

Coordinates: 21°38′N 31°6′E

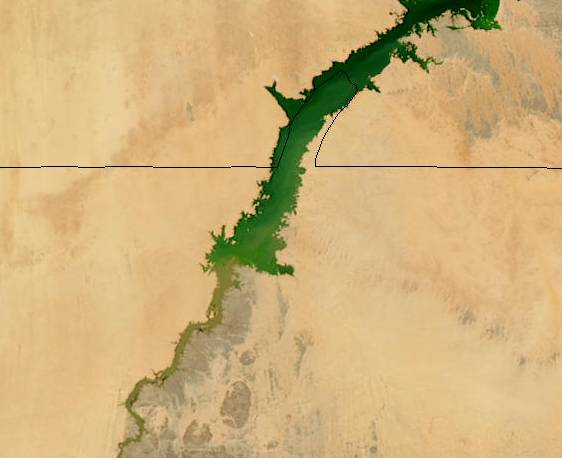
Lake Nubia, 2003

Askut (also known in ancient Egypt as Djer-Setiu) was an ancient Egyptian island fortress in the Middle Kingdom on the Nile, which was built for the purpose of securing the border to Nubia. Since the completion of the Aswan High Dam, the island has been flooded with Lake Nubia.

The fort, about 351 kilometers south of Aswan was built by Sesostris III. It measured 77 × 87 meters. The protective wall had a thickness of 5.3 meters and had spur-like bastions. The highly fortified entrance protected a temple and warehouses along the harbor. Inside the castle were a commander's house and barracks. Pottery has been unearthed at the site dated to the early 13th Dynasty.

== Introduction ==
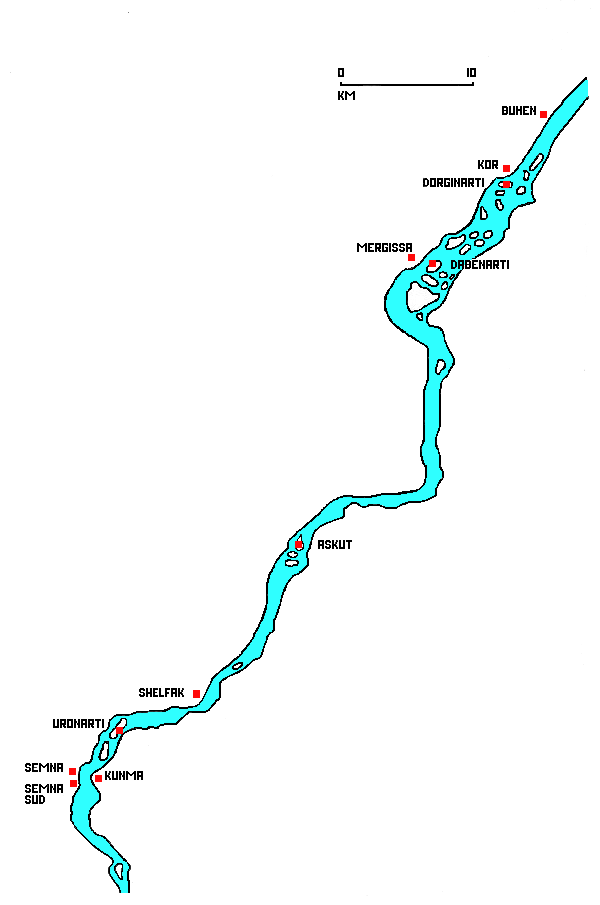
showing were all the fortresses were

Askut was an ancient Egyptian fortress located on an island on the Nile during the Middle Kingdom. Its intention was to seal the border to Nubia. It was excavated by Alexander Badawy during the Aswan High Dam Salvage Campaign which aimed to preserve sites threatened by the building of the Aswan Dam. Fortresses such as this one were typically home to a large community of diverse geographical origin and ethnicity. Different roles were taken on by all members of the community, however men typically dominated the roles associated with military, politics, and economics. An important part of uncovering this site included understanding the social context associated with the environment and material culture.

== Fortress ==
Ancient Egypt and Nubia often were at odds along the cataracts that defined their borders. Askut was part of a larger system of Egyptian fortresses that stretched along the border with Nubia. Egypt had interest in this area for both security and the resources, as gold was abundant in the area. Askut lay south of the Second Cataract, and was set to be the northernmost of multiple forts, such as Shalfak.

== Demography, gender, and ethnicity ==
=== Layout ===
As Askut began to transition into a more settlement style pattern, old three-room barracks indicating a military like set up began to shift and individualize. Many floor plans and spaces were rebuilt, and domestic spaces turned into a layout that was more diverse and fit the needs of different types of families. The Southeastern part of this site gives evidence that these changes were implemented in the New Kingdom but could have begun at the end of the Middle Kingdom. Important areas of the fortress were left behind and filled with trash, such as the granary complex. In the New Kingdom, a large area of Askut was transformed into a fundamental house with a central courtyard, encircled by rooms. Only an old barrack remains from the Middle Kingdom and these changes could represent a response to significant events unfolding during the Second Intermediate Period after a period of warfare with the reconquest of Lower Nubia. This new organization of the community came about as a desire for comfortable access to the riverbank.

=== Gender and children ===
The role of women and children were extremely important to the Askut society. Nubian and Egyptian women appear very rarely in textual records, and they are always almost considered subordinate to the men of the society. However, there were an array of Nubian cookpots and cuisine that represent the large role and influence that Nubian woman had on the community's foodways, which became increasingly important for Nubian identity and dominated a large amount of their social context.

Children are often underrepresented because they are hard to see in the archaeological record. At Askut however, objects like gaming pieces or ceramic buttons that make enjoyable whirring noises and motion indicate the presence of children. Figurines could also have been used by children; however, archeologists are unsure due to the fact that they could have been used by adults as offerings in religious rituals. Today, child life may seem relaxed and playful, however in the past children were heavily involved in many productive activities in this community. In evidence of pottery production, some argue that small, poorly done pots could reflect that they were made by children. Evidence of this was done through comparing patterns on the pots with studies of childhood Moto development and cognitive development. Even some fingerprint evidence of children was discovered on pottery.

=== Ethnicity ===
Since fortresses are usually based on boundaries or within conquered territories, ethnicity is a great way of understanding more about the site's context. In Askut, ethnicity is studied as multi-dimensional, situational and overlapping, constructed and negotiated, rather than simply rigid and fixed. Material culture is understood in specific social contexts where ethnicity is approached as changeable and subjective. Fortresses such as Askut are a site of extreme interaction that signify differences and the importance of ethnic identity as multi scalar. Vessels that showed pre-depositional sooting indicated that they were used for cooking. Some pottery sherds of these vessels suggest a difference in foods cooked in Egyptian style and Nubian style cookpots. Cemeteries provide insight into the complexities of ethnicity at this site. The cemetery of Tombos, near Askut provides evidence for an ethnic dynamic that included colonists and natives at Askut. Furthermore, through bioarcaheological analysis archaeologists are able to see the appearance of immigrants and a blending with the Egyptian and Nubian. At Tombos, a study of Strontium Isotopes in teeth point archaeologists to the origin of an individual and the specific craniofacial proportions that link them to Egyptian, Nubian, or mixed ancestry.

== Religion ==
Religious practices played a large role in the lives of those living in the fortress society. Large temples that appear in Askut reflect the belief and the practices of the site, however, artifacts found in everyday households better reflect everyday religious activity. Votive objects found inside homes give insight into an egalitarian understanding of religion at Askut. Although Askut did not have a state-sponsored temple, the residents did build a small chapel. Inside there were many indicators of religious activities including tall white painted stands, incense burners, balls of incense, a copper alloy knife for sacrifices, a stone offering table, and an altar with remains of food offerings still present. Inhabitants built household shrines and often artifacts like incense burners, amulets, and figurines were found. A specific charring at the bottom of certain bowls indicated that they were specifically used for burning incense and they account for one percent of the total ceramic assemblage at Askut. These bowls were found in the chapel as well as inside of the homes. This could indicate complex religious rituals; however, it could also point to simple cleansing rituals that are still practiced in Egyptian and Nubian households today. There were some artifacts found that indicate that women were at the center of some of these religious practices, A Nubian style female figurine points to a certain faith centered around women and fertility. All of these religious artifacts were a key part of Nubian identity in and out of the households.

== Finds and craft production ==
The shift to a more domestic layout is further supported through the findings of jar stoppers in a large room at the southern end of the site that indicate beer production on a large scale. However, this large scale does move into the households on a smaller scale during the end of the Middle Kingdom. Bread molds are also found and indicate household style baking for smaller groups rather than central baking on a larger scale. Local harvesting of grain is supported by the finding of artifacts such as sickle blades, however they could have also been used for making matts and baskets. Large amounts of cattle were domesticated according to faunal remains and small amounts of hunted animals such as gazelle. Since this site was located near the river, this provided shellfish and fish that is supported by the findings of fishing net weights which would allow them to be dragged along by boats and collect the fish.

=== Middle Kingdom craft production ===
Molds were used to make tools such as hammer stones and anvils. Crucibles (a ceramic or metal container) and copper waste was also uncovered in the southern end of the site near the households. Evidence of pottery is seen through fragments of unfired vessels and a potter's wheel head. These date to shapes seen in both the Middle Kingdom and the New Kingdom. Archaeologists believe there may have been a workshop present at Askut mostly run by Egyptian men, due to the evidence that Egyptian potters at Askut used a narrower set of clay sources. On the other hand, Nubian potters mostly consisted of women, and they used varying sets of clay resources that indicate production was mainly done in the household.

== Bibliogrophy ==
- Badawy, Alexander (1964). "Preliminary Report on the Excavations by the University of California at Askut (First Season, October 1962–January 1963)". Kush, 12, pp. 47–53.
- Badawy, Alexander (1965). "Askut: A Middle Kingdom Fortress in Nubia". Archaeology, 18, pp. 124–131.
- Badawy, Alexander (1966). "Archaeological Problems Relating to the Egyptian Fortress at Askut". Journal of the American Research Center in Egypt, 5, pp. 23–27.
- Smith, Stuart Tyson (1991). "Askut and the Role of the Second Cataract Forts". Journal of the American Research Center in Egypt, 28, pp. 107–132.
- Smith, Stuart Tyson (1995). Askut in Nubia: The Economics and Ideology of Egyptian Imperialism in the Second Millennium B.C. London and New York: Kegan Paul International.
- Smith, Stuart Tyson (1995). "Askut's Ancient Name and Administrative System". In Études nubiennes: Conférence de Genève, actes du VIIe Congrès international d'études nubiennes, vol. 2, pp. 37–44.
- Smith, Stuart Tyson (2003). "Pots and Politics: Ceramics from Askut and Egyptian Colonialism during the Middle through New Kingdoms". In Egyptian Pottery: Proceedings of the 1990 Pottery Symposium at the University of California, Berkeley, pp. 38–79.
- Smith, Stuart Tyson (2017). "A Potter's Wheelhead from Askut and the Organization of the Egyptian Ceramic Industry in Nubia". Journal of the American Research Center in Egypt, 50, pp. 103–121.
- van Gerven Oei, Vincent W. J., and Alexandros Tsakos (2018). "An Old Nubian Letter from the Daughter of an Eparch". Dotawo, 5, pp. 91–98.
