= Dabenarti =

Island in Sudan

Dabenarti is an island in Sudan, situated in the middle of the Nile near the Second Cataract. It is close to Mirgissa, 900 metres (3,000 ft) from its east wall, and about 5 kilometres (3.1 mi) south of the Buhen fortress. A fortress on the island was attributed to the Egyptian Nubian period. Construction began during the reign of Senusret I, around 1900 BC, and was completed under Senusret III. Landing at the island fort, measuring 60 by 230 metres (200 ft × 750 ft) in size, was difficult, and it was never completed. With the collapse of Egyptian power at the end of the Middle Kingdom, Dabenarti was abandoned around 1700 BC. It was examined in 1916 by Somers Clarke.
