= Kumma (Nubia) =

Archaeological site

Coordinates: 21.5°N 30.966667°E

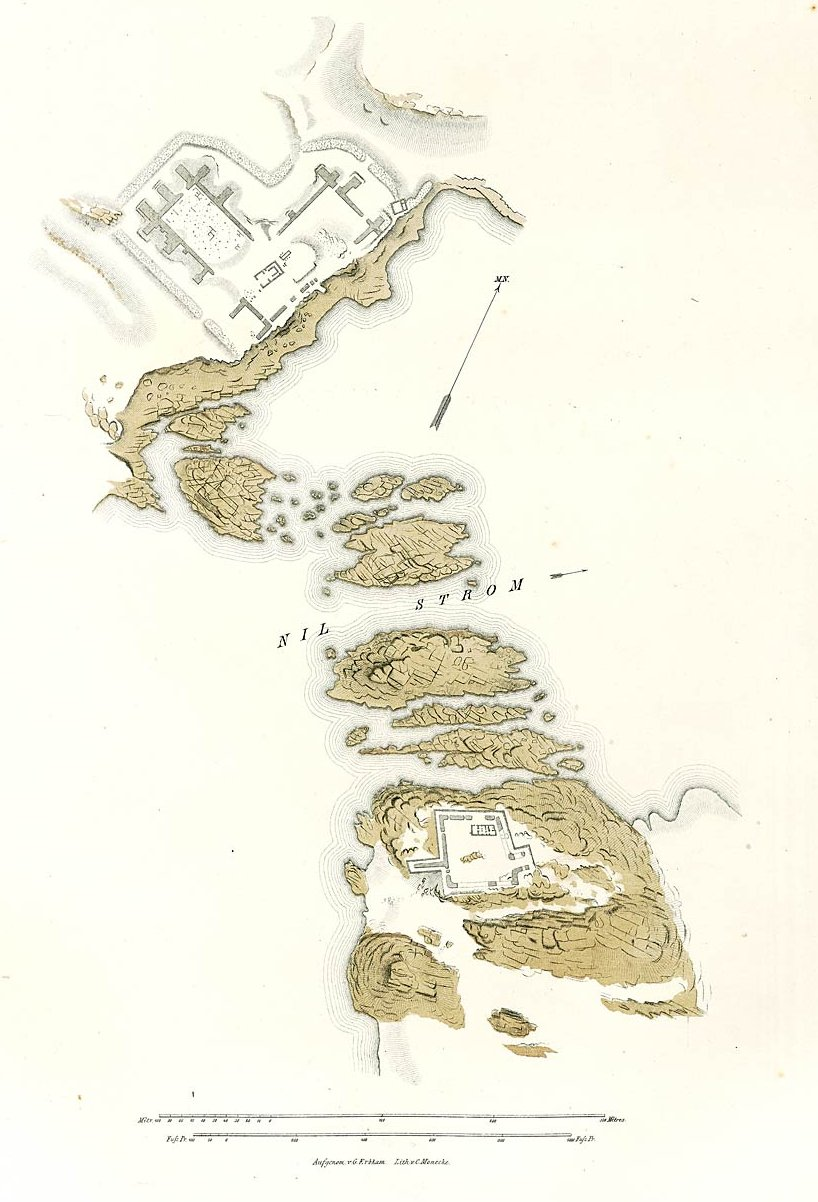
Situation plan of Kumma and Semna

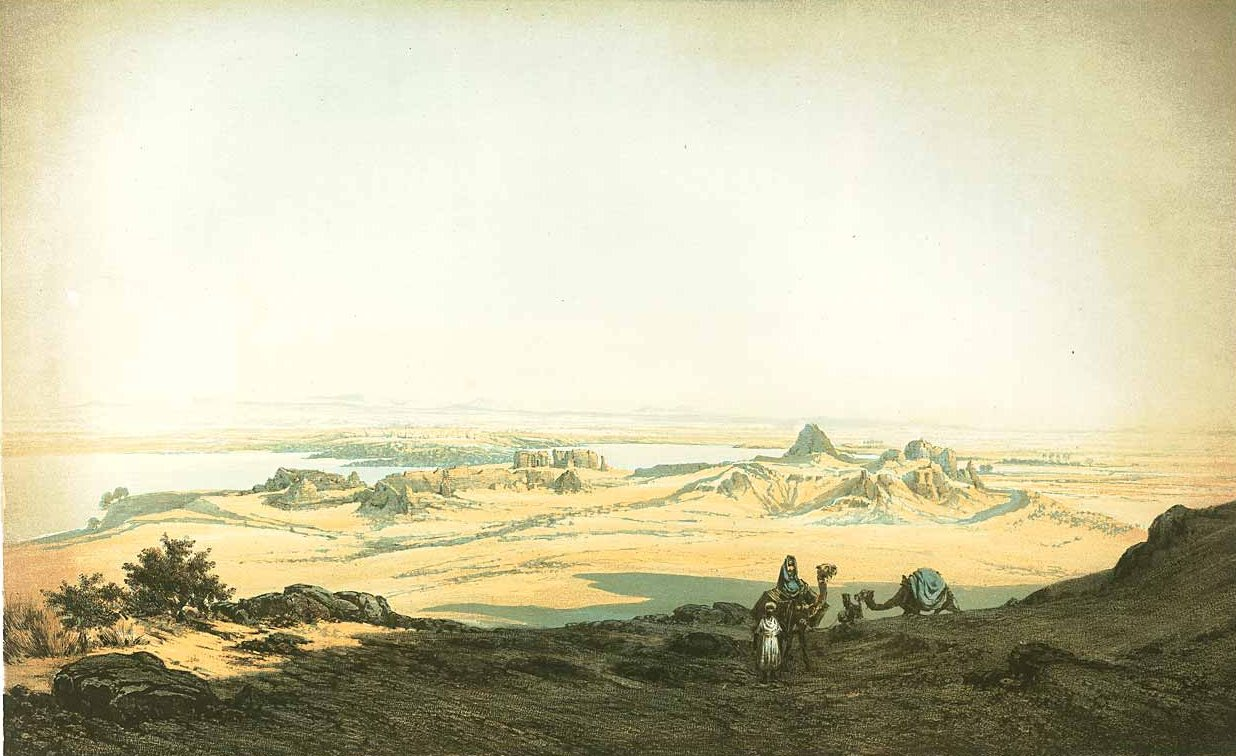
Semna and Kumma, view from the west, mid-19th century

Kumma or Semna East is an archaeological site in Sudan. Established in the mid-12th Dynasty of Egypt, it served as a fortress of ancient Egypt in Nubia. Along with Semna, Kumma was built by the Pharaoh Sesostris III (1878 BC – 1839 BC). The forts protected the border between ancient Egypt and the southern areas.

Kumma is situated about 365 kilometres (227 mi) south of Aswan, and 35 kilometres (22 mi) southwest of the second cataract of the Nile on the eastern bank. Semna is located on the other side. Both locations are flooded today because of the Aswan High Dam on Lake Nubia. The salvaged temple of Khnum is rebuilt in the National Museum of Sudan at Khartoum.
