= List of lakes of Egypt =

Egypt contains many lakes currently and other lakes that have vanished.

== Current lakes ==
=== Lake Nasser ===
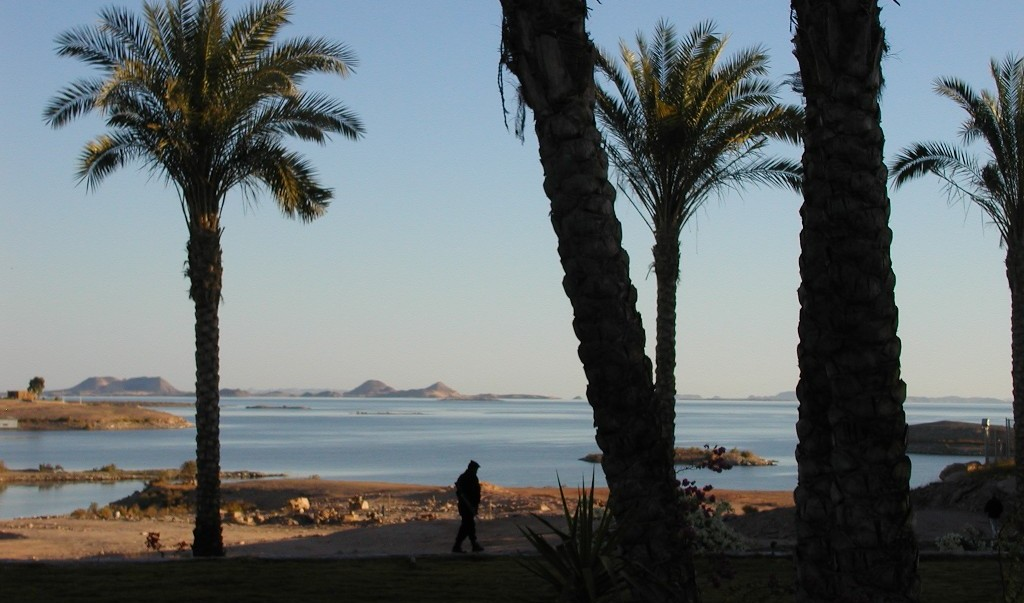
Lake Nasser from Abu Simbel

A vast reservoir in southern Egypt and northern Sudan created by the damming of the Nile after the construction of the High Dam of Aswan.

=== Manzala Lake ===
Salt or brackish water lake. In northeastern Egypt on the Nile Delta near Port Said, Damietta, Dakahlyia and Sharqyia governorates.

=== Maryut Lake ===
A salt lake in northern Egypt, between Alexandria and Al-Buhira (Beheira actually is named after it) Governorates.

=== Lake Bardawil ===
Salt water lake in North Sinai Governorate. It is said that it is named after King Baldwin I of Jerusalem of the First Crusade and that he was buried there.

=== Lake Moeris or Qaroun Lake ===
Brackish water lake. South River Nile Delta in Fayoum Governorate.

=== Wadi Elrayan Lakes ===
Brackish water lake. In Fayoum Governorate

=== Edko Lake ===
Salt water lake in Al Bouhaira Governorate

=== Toshka Lakes ===
River water lake. In South Western Part of Egypt.

=== Great Bitter Lake or al-Buhayrat al-Murrah ===
A salt water lake between the north and south part of the Suez Canal, includes Greater Bitter Lake and Lesser Bitter Lakes and el-Temmsah Lake (The crocodile lake). In Ismailia Governorate.

=== Borolus Lake or Paralos lake ===
Salt water lake in North shore of River Nile Delta, Western corner in Kafr el-Sheikh Governorate.

=== Wadi El Natrun Lakes ===
Salt alkaline water lakes (Contain Natron Salt) in Wadi Natron area near el-Qattara Depression in Matruh Governorate.

=== Salt lakes of Siwa ===
In Matrouh Governorate, Siwa Oasis in Western Desert.
