= Tzitzis =

Tzitzis may refer to:

- Tzitzis, the Ashkenazi pronunciation of tzitzit, fringes or tassels found on a tallit or tallit katan worn by observant Jews
- Tzitzis - classical name for Qertassi, an ancient site, now submerged in Lake Nasser, in Lower Nubia, Egypt
