= Buhen =

Ancient Egyptian fortress

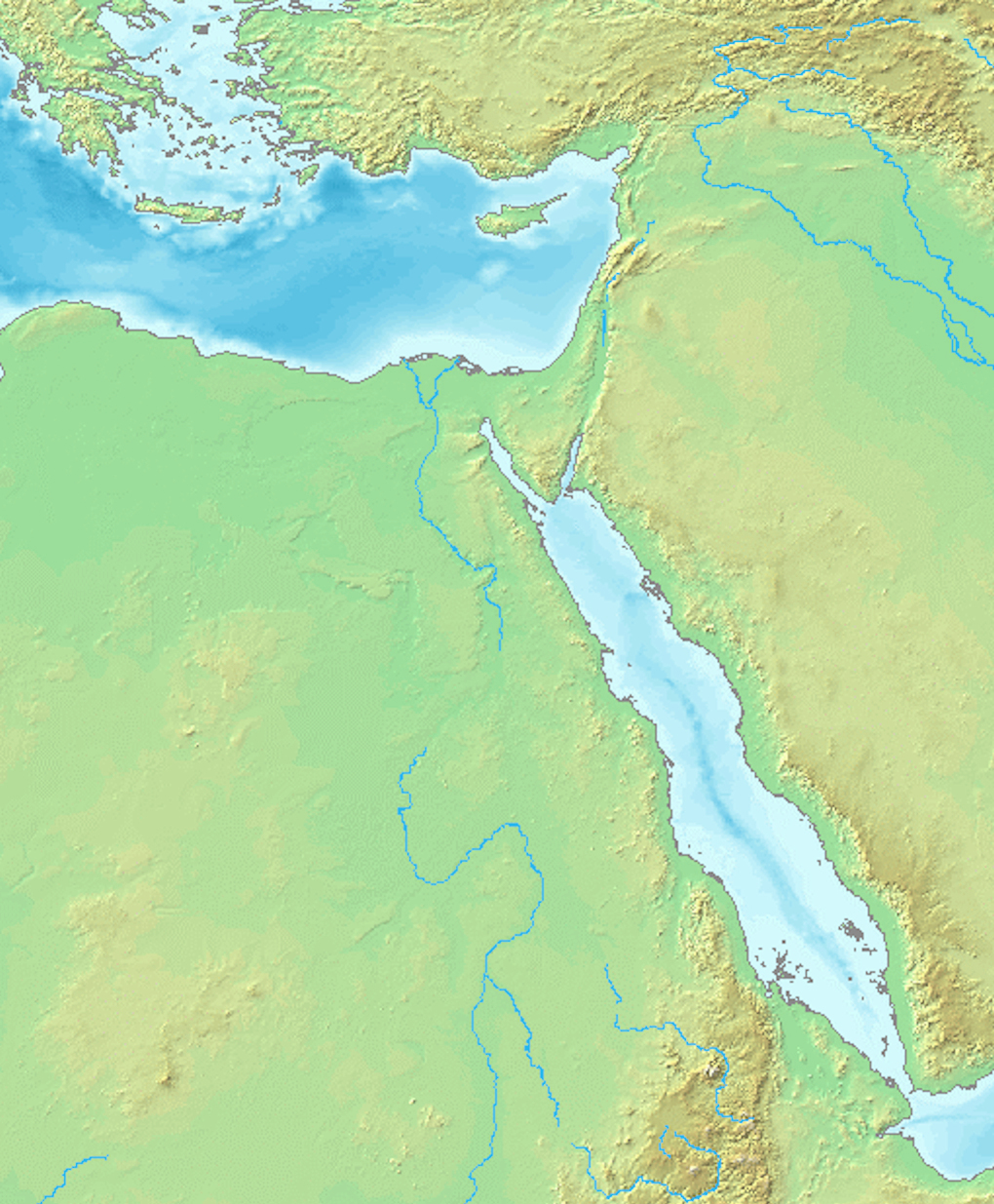
- Location within Northeast Africa Location within Sudan
- 21°55′N 31°17′E
- Type: Settlement
- Location: Northern, Sudan
- Region: Old Kingdom

Buhen, alternatively known as Βοὥν (Bohón) in Ancient Greek, stands as a significant ancient Egyptian settlement on the western bank of the Nile, just below the Second Cataract in present-day Northern State, Sudan. Its origins trace back to the Old Kingdom period (about 2686–2181BCE), where it served as an Egyptian colonial town, particularly recognized for copper smelting. In 1962, archaeological discoveries brought to light an ancient copper manufacturing facility encircled by an imposing stone barrier, indicating its origin during the rule of Sneferu in the 4th Dynasty. Inscriptions and graffiti disclosed a continuous Egyptian presence spanning two centuries, only to be interrupted by migration from the southern regions in the 5th Dynasty.

== History of Buhen ==
b h n niwt or b h n xAst
b(w)hn
in hieroglyphs
Era: Middle Kingdom
(2055–1650 BC)

In the Old Kingdom (about 2686–2181 BCE), there was an Egyptian colonial town at Buhen, which was also used for copper working. An archaeological investigation in 1962 revealed what was described as an ancient copper factory. This was surrounded by a massive though crude stone wall, and further evidence points to the colony having been supplied from the north. The settlement may have been established during the reign of Sneferu, of the 4th Dynasty. Nevertheless, there is evidence of earlier 2nd Dynasty occupation at Buhen.

Graffiti and other inscribed items from the site show that the Egyptians stayed about 200 years, until late in the 5th Dynasty, when they were probably forced out by immigration from the south.

In the Middle Kingdom (2055-1650 BCE), the fortress at Buhen was established. The physical geography of Buhen worked to the benefit of the fortress. The large rock wall provided a strong preliminary base for the construction of the fortress. During the Middle Kingdom, the majority of people occupying Buhen were Egyptians who were directed south from Lower Egypt, and cycled through.

Following the Middle Kingdom came the Second-Intermediate Period. With the Second Intermediate Period came the Funerary Stele of Sebek-dedu and Sebek-em-heb. The excavation of the stele produced a new understanding of the annexation of Nubia at the site of Buhen. The stele iterates that the Egyptians who had gained control over Buhen had been dependent on Nubian kings in achieving this.

=== The Buhen Horse ===
The Buhen horse holds significant archaeological importance, particularly noted in the works of Professor Emery in 1959 and 1960. Currently housed at the Khartoum Museum and on loan to the Department of Egyptology at University College London, the horse's skeleton originates from excavations conducted at the Buhen fortress by the Egypt Exploration Society, under Emery's direction in 1958 and 1959.

During the initial sacking of the fortress circa 1675 BC, the horse, potentially confined between two bastions of the main fortress wall, met its demise, falling onto a brick pavement. Subsequent layers of rubble and the later reconstruction efforts of the New Kingdom encased the horse's remains within the fortress walls, offering a clear chronological context for its discovery.

Identifying the species of the animal posed an initial challenge. Since true horses were not native to Ancient Egypt, while both wild and domestic asses were common, and Grevy's zebra (Equus grevyi) was likely available, confirming its identity was crucial. Notably, Grevy's zebra, the largest and northernmost distributed among zebra species, could feasibly be mistaken for a horse. However, the structure of the Buhen horse's skeleton aligns with those introduced into various regions during the same era, such as India, Iran, northern Mesopotamia, Syria, Egypt, and Greece.

== Fortress ==
Buhen is known for its large fortress, probably constructed during the rule of Senusret III in around 1860 BCE (12th Dynasty). Senusret III conducted four campaigns into Kush and established a line of forts within signaling distance of one another; Buhen was the northernmost of these. The other forts along the banks were Mirgissa, Shalfak, Uronarti, Askut, Dabenarti, Semna, and Kumma. The Kushites captured Buhen during the 13th Dynasty, and held it until Ahmose I recaptured it at the beginning of the 18th Dynasty.

One of the contributing factors for the creation of the fortress in Buhen was the goal of annexing Nubia. Both Senusret I and Senusret III dedicated much of their reign to campaigning into Nubia, in an attempt to extend the boundaries of Egypt. In doing so, the two kings built the fortress in Buhen, along with the other fortresses around the 2nd cataract. These fortresses established a new border for Upper Egypt.

The fortress itself extended more than 150 metres (490 ft) along the west bank of the Nile. It covered 13,000 square metres (140,000 ft^{2}), and had within its wall a small town laid out in a grid system. At its peak it probably had a population of around 3,500 people. The fortress also included the administration for the whole fortified region of the Second Cataract. Its fortifications included a moat three meters deep, drawbridges, bastions, buttresses, ramparts, battlements, loopholes, and a catapult. The outer wall included an area between the two walls pierced with a double row of arrow loops, allowing both standing and kneeling archers to fire at the same time. The walls of the fort were about 5 metres (16 ft) thick and 10 metres (33 ft) high. The walls of Buhen were crafted with rough stone. The walls of Buhen are unique as most Egyptian fortress walls were constructed with timber and mud-brick. The fortress at Buhen is now submerged under Lake Nasser as a result of the construction of the Aswan Dam in 1964.

=== Headquarters ===
At Buhen, the central administrative hub occupied the northern corner of the settlement. Spanning the entirety of block A, its expansive footprint surpassed 1000m². Positioned directly adjacent to the main wall, the structure boasted a single entrance located in the western corner. Upon entry, one would encounter an anteroom with a solitary pillar. Adjacent to this space lay another anteroom, also featuring a lone pillar, and connected to a staircase and a brief hallway.

Dominating the center of the edifice stood a grand hall adorned with fifteen imposing pillars. Towards the northeast, an additional sizable hall, flanked by six pillars, was accompanied by a slender elongated chamber leading to three smaller rooms. Meanwhile, to the southwest of the central hall, two diminutive chambers resided. One boasted a rectangular layout, while the other featured a square shape and was supported by four pillars. Encircling these chambers and the central hall were three elongated corridors.

Ascending the smaller staircase granted access to the upper floor, while the larger staircase ascended to the apex of the main wall. Archaeological investigations revealed remnants of decorative paintings and remnants of weaponry within the structure, indicating its repurposing during the New Kingdom period. The fortress at Buhen is now submerged under Lake Nasser as a result of the construction of the Aswan Dam in 1964. Before the site was covered with water, it was excavated by a team led by Walter Bryan Emery.

== Copper production ==
The investigation into potential copper production activities at Buhen offers valuable insights into ancient metallurgical practices. Emery's discovery of what he identified as an Old Kingdom copper 'factory' has drawn attention from Egyptologists interested in metalworking techniques. Samples collected from the site, including copper ore fragments, smelted copper metal, slag, crucible pieces, and a small copper artifact, were sent to the Petrie Museum of Egyptian Archaeology at University College London for analysis. El Gayar and Jones conducted the analysis at the Royal School of Mines in London. However, attempts to locate these samples have been unsuccessful.

Analysis of a 150 gm ore sample revealed its composition, predominantly consisting of finely dispersed quartz (approximately 44 wt%) and malachite, with notable traces of atacamite, a copper chloride. It was proposed that atacamite formation occurred during occasional Nile inundations when malachite reacted with chlorine ions. Other elements detected through atomic absorption analysis includedzinc, calcium, lead, and silver, with minimal iron content.

Further analysis using an Electron Probe Micro-Analyzer detected an average of 0.18 wt% gold in parts of the ore prepared for optical microscopy. Crucible smelting was suggested as a practice at the site, and the ore's association with nearby gold deposits was speculated.

However, recent research challenges Emery's interpretations, with some scholars questioning the site's use for pyro-metallurgical treatment. There are doubts about some of Emery's metallurgical features.

=== Copper smelting ===
In 1962, an archaeological expedition to Buhen discovered a copper smelter. Buhen would have been an ideal location to produce small quantities of copper, which requires several local resources: human labor, water, clay, wood, a mineral-based flux, and large quantities of ore. During the time of the Old Kingdom, Buhen could offer almost everything necessary: the nearby Nile provided both water and clay, Egypt had many skilled workers who could be brought to Buhen, and although there is little local timber now remaining, during the Old Kingdom, the higher rainfall would have supported more timber along the Nile and Wadis. The furnace slags found contained iron, indicative of a ferruginous flux, which requires iron oxide and is abundant throughout the Nile valley. However, not much is known about the sources of the ore. The excavation found copper ores, which analysis showed were initially atacamite and later atacamite containing gold. All the copper deposits recorded in Egypt and Northern Sudan are a long way from Buhen and located to the east of the Nile; this required transportation over long distances and across the river.

A large number of andirons were found in Buhen. Andirons were commonly used in Egyptian cooking, but these were associated with copper smelting. Exactly how they were used in the smelting process is not known other than being involved in fire and burning. The copper produced was probably used in the manufacture of household and agricultural tools, including knives and hoes.

== Gallery ==
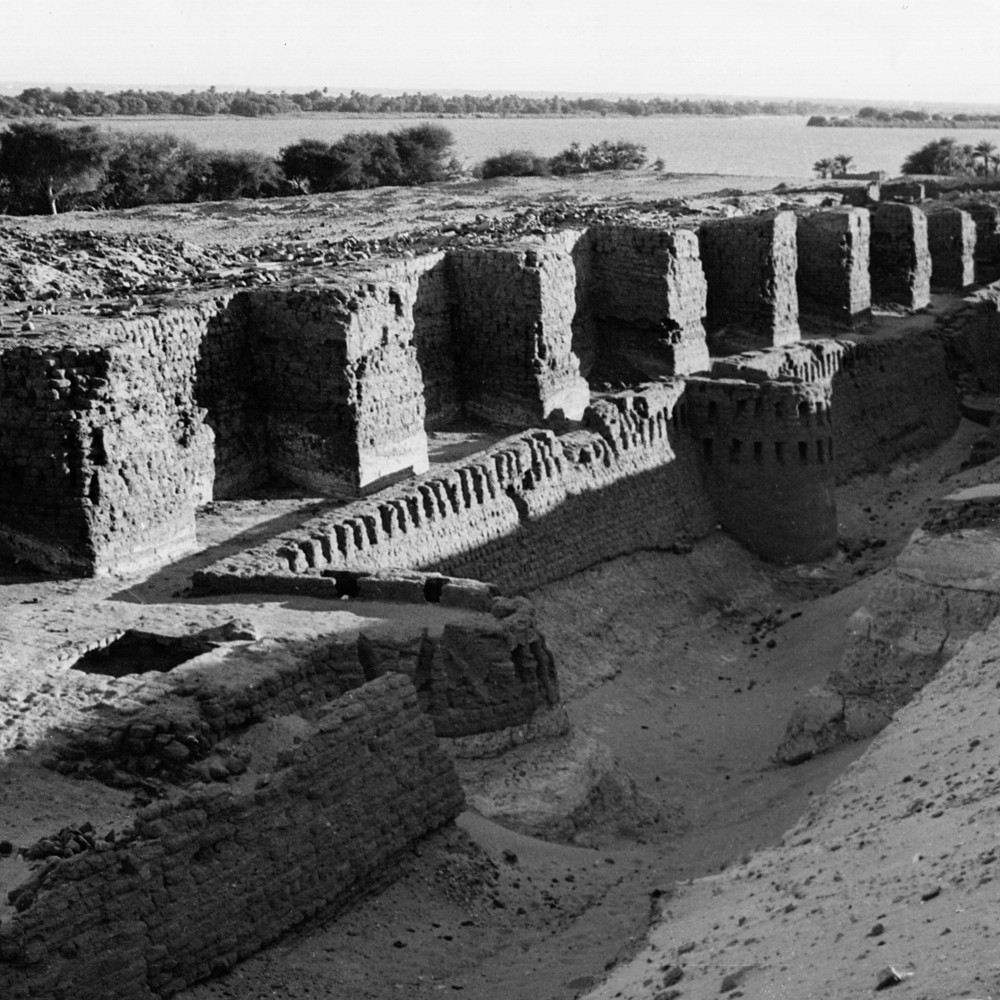
Middle Kingdom fortress reconstructed under the New Kingdom c. 1200 BCE.

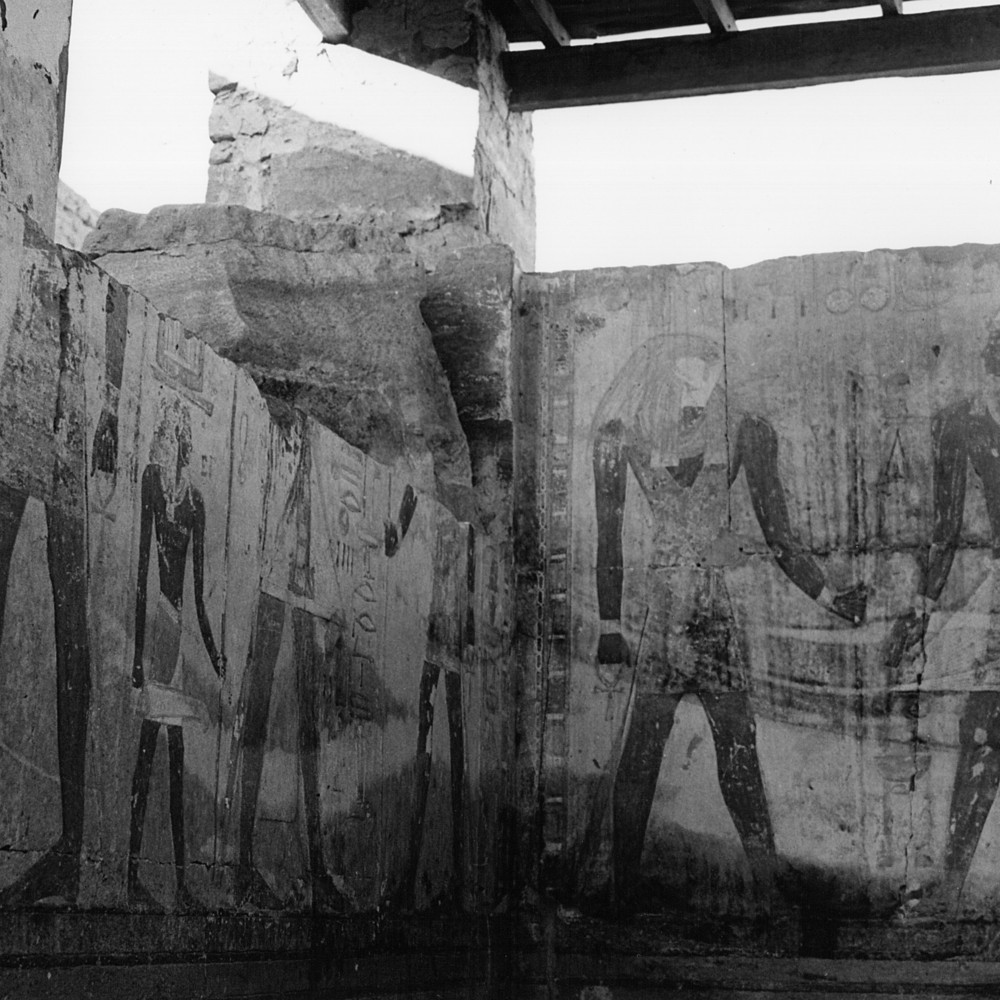
The Horus temple of Buhen in its original location.

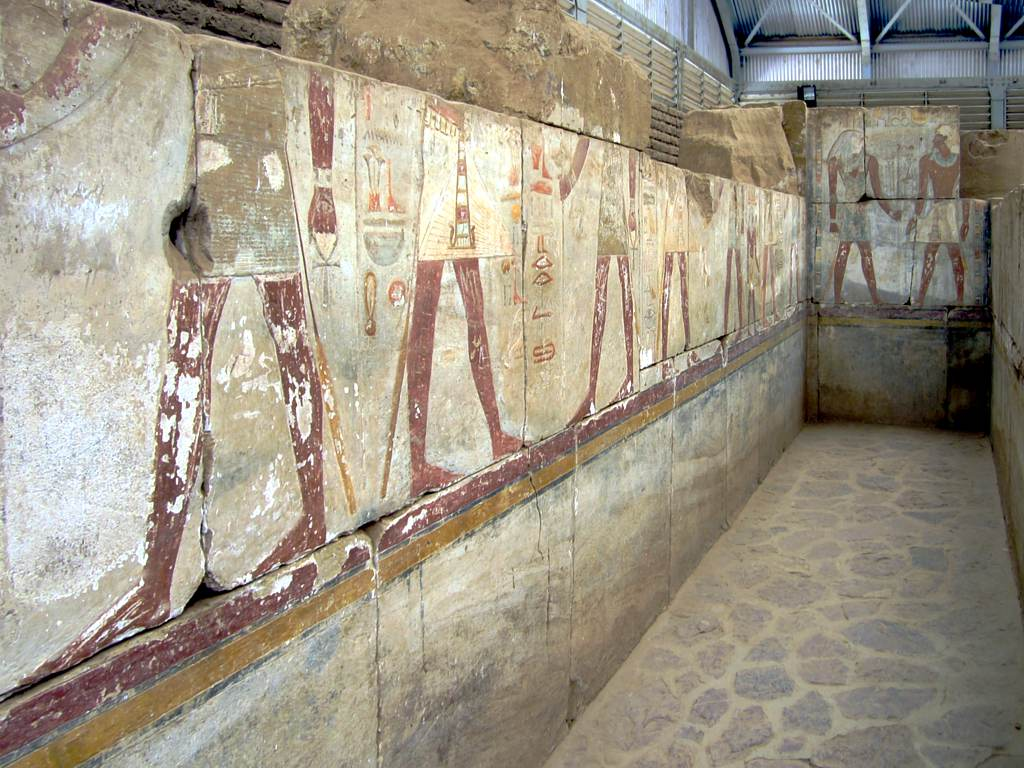
The Horus temple of Buhen in the Sudan National Museum

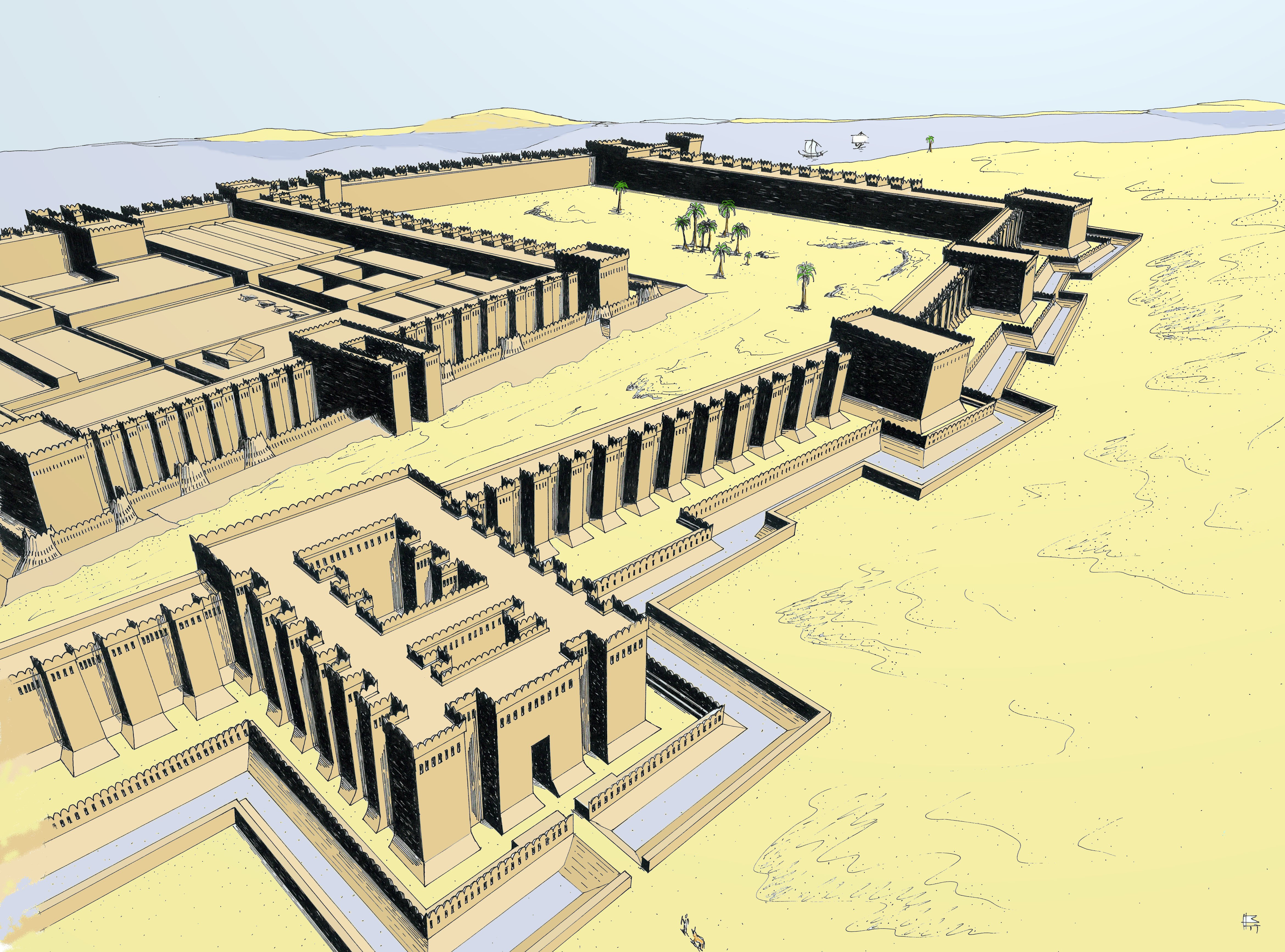
A view of the fortress from the north (artist's impression)

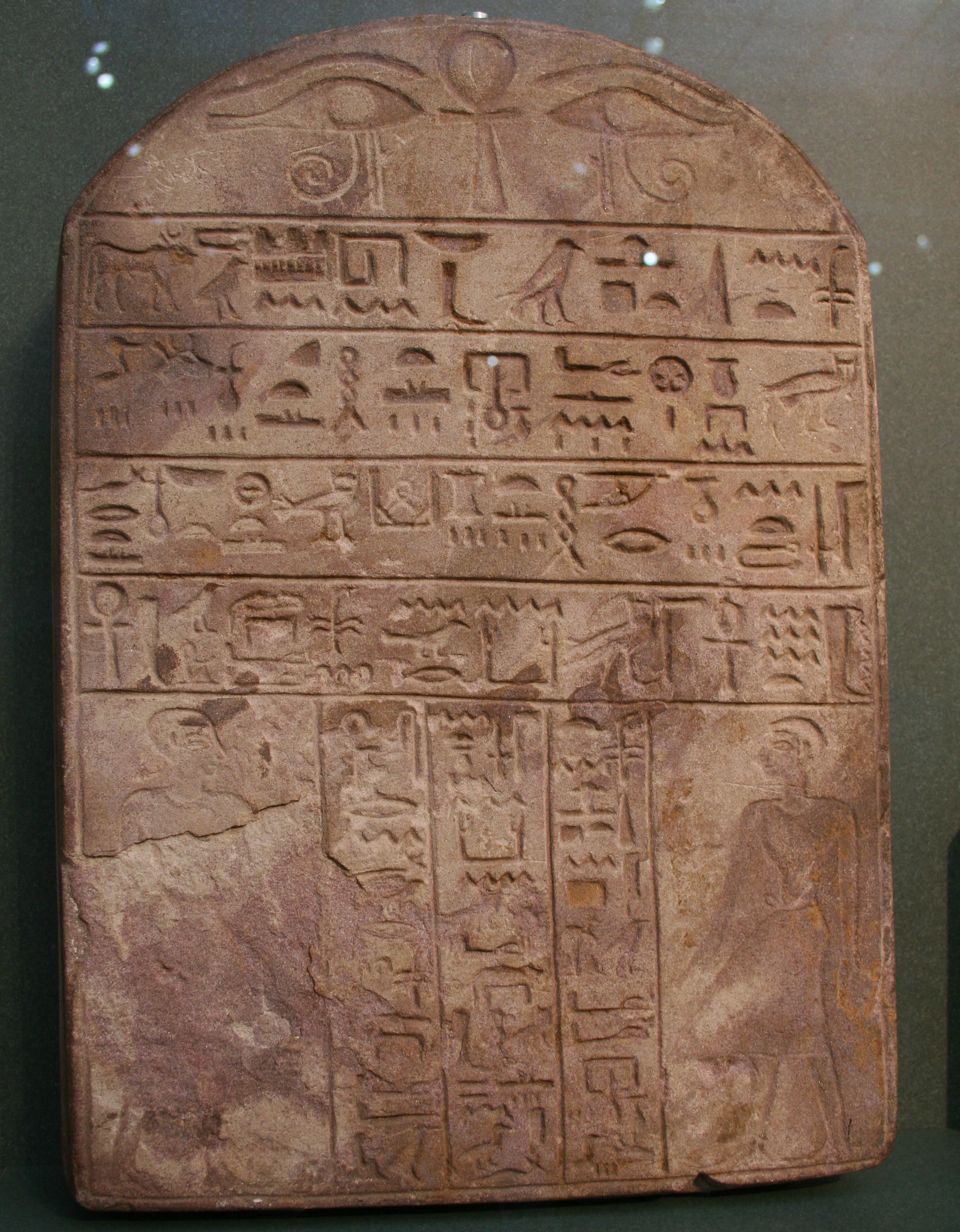
Funerary stele of Sebek-dedu and Sebek-em-heb, found in Buhen. This stele provided new knowledge of a Nubian ruler, Nedjeh, and suggests that there was some dependency on Nubian kings.

== Bibliography ==
BADAWY, ALEXANDER M. “ASKUT: A Middle Kingdom Fortress in Nubia.” Archaeology, vol. 18, no. 2, 1965, pp. 124–31. J STOR, http://www.jstor.org/stable/41667517. Accessed 5 Mar. 2024.

Davey, CJ, et al. “Egyptian Middle Kingdom Copper: Analysis of a Crucible from Buhen in the Petrie Museum.” UCL Discovery - UCL Discovery, Apr. 2021, discovery.ucl.ac.uk/id/eprint/10124084/. Accessed 3 Mar. 2024.

Raulwing, Peter, and Juliet Clutton-Brock. "The Buhen Horse: Fifty Years after Its Discovery (1958–2008)". Journal of Egyptian History 2.1 (2009): 1–106. https://doi.org/10.1163/187416509X12492786609122 Web. Accessed 3 Mar. 2024.

Stanley, Daniel Jean, and Jonathan G. Wingerath. “Clay Mineral Distributions to Interpret Nile Cell Provenance and Dispersal: I. Lower River Nile to Delta Sector.” Journal of Coastal Research, vol. 12, no. 4, 1996, pp. 911–29. JSTOR, http://www.jstor.org/stable/4298542. Accessed 5 Mar. 2024.
