= X-Group culture =

Nubian cultural period from the 1st millennium AD

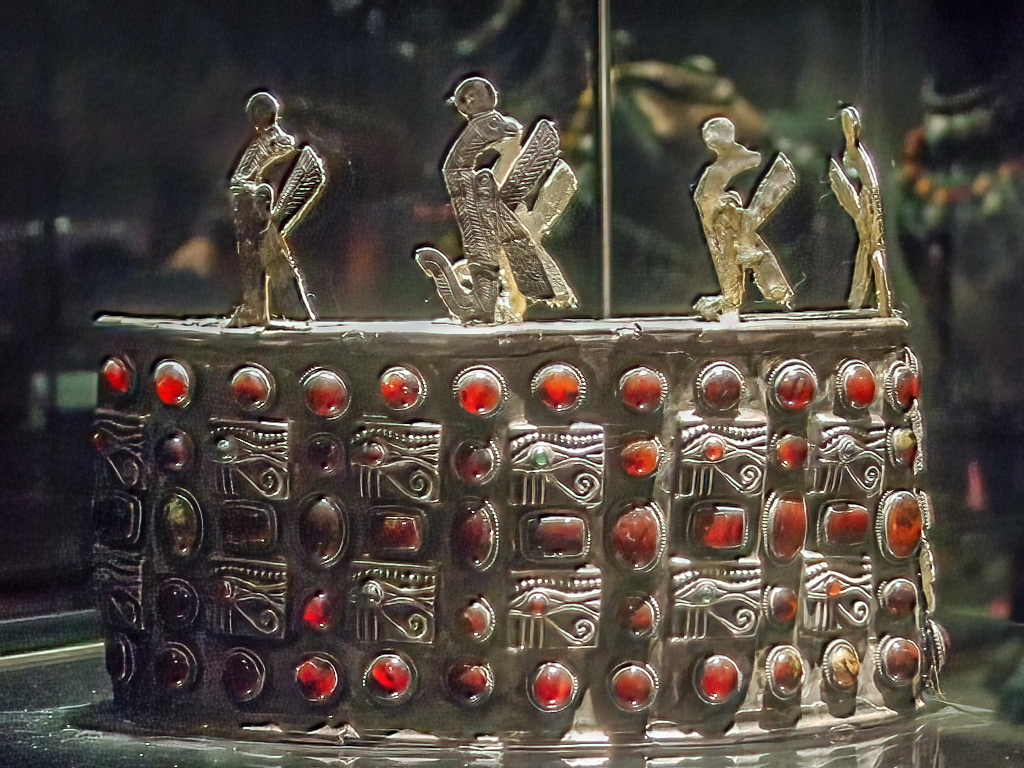
A royal crown from the post-Meroitic and pre-Christian period of Nubia. It was found in Ballana by W.B. Emery in tomb 118.

The X-Group Culture (ca. 300-600 AD) was an ancient Nubian civilization that existed in Lower Nubia. Cemetery excavations revealed that the civilization stretched from the Dodekaschoinos in the north to Delgo in the south.

== Excavations ==
George A. Reisner coined the term X-Group Culture for lack of a more exact historical definition. This anonymous type of terminology has been replaced by the term Ballana culture due to the increase of knowledge and new findings in Qustul and Ballana as proposed by Bruce Trigger.

According to Egyptologists Keith Seele and Bruce Williams, the burials of X-Group are evidence of an evolution from the earlier Meroitic graves to those at Ballana, which were principally Nubian in origin along with the majority of the items found within them. In one royal tomb, a queen was discovered, accompanied by seventeen human sacrifices. Another royal tomb contained a body of a man who was likely a king, offerings of food and drinks, and his personal items, such as a crown, board game and weapons.

== Gallery ==
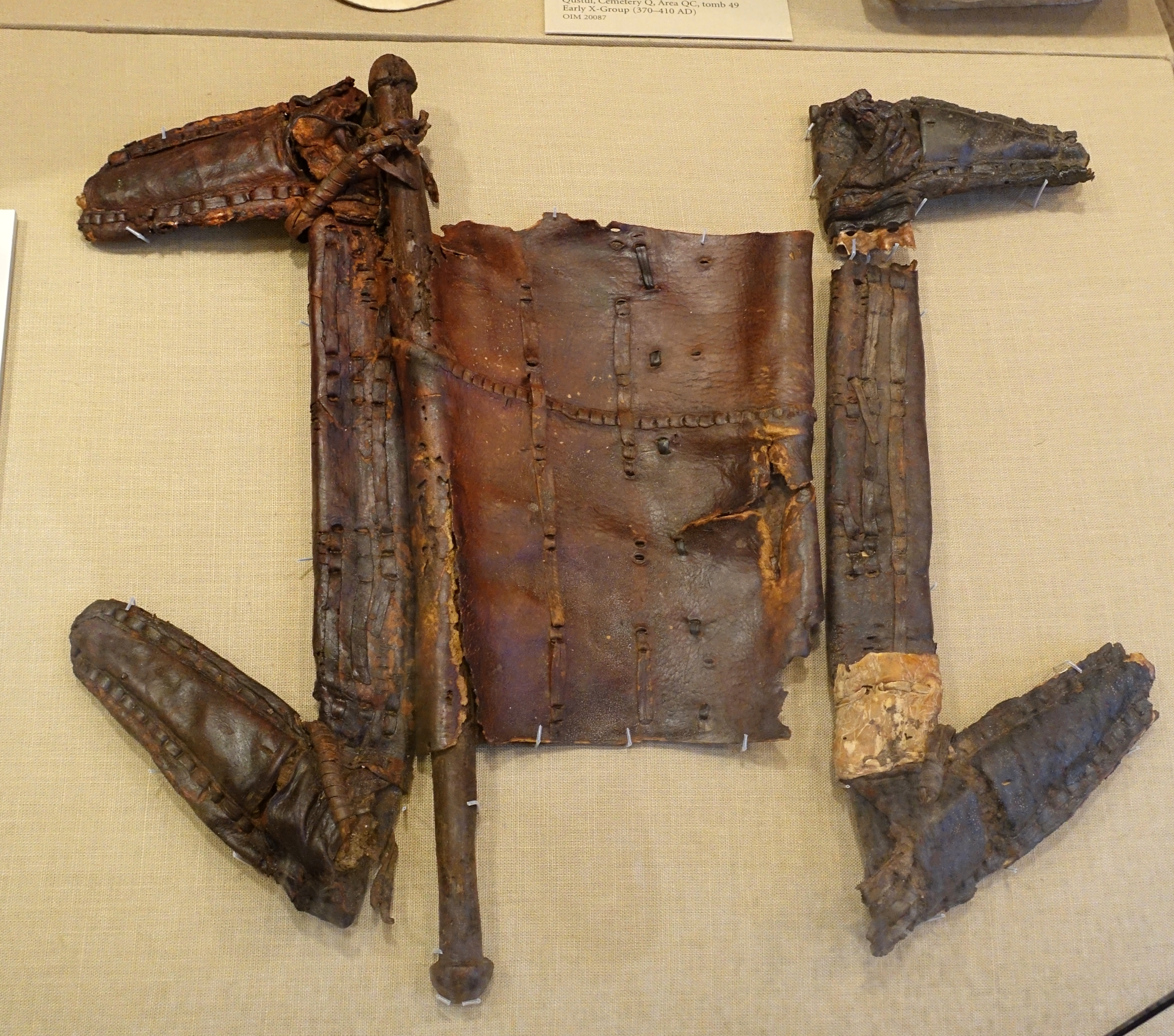
Saddle with frame, c. AD 375

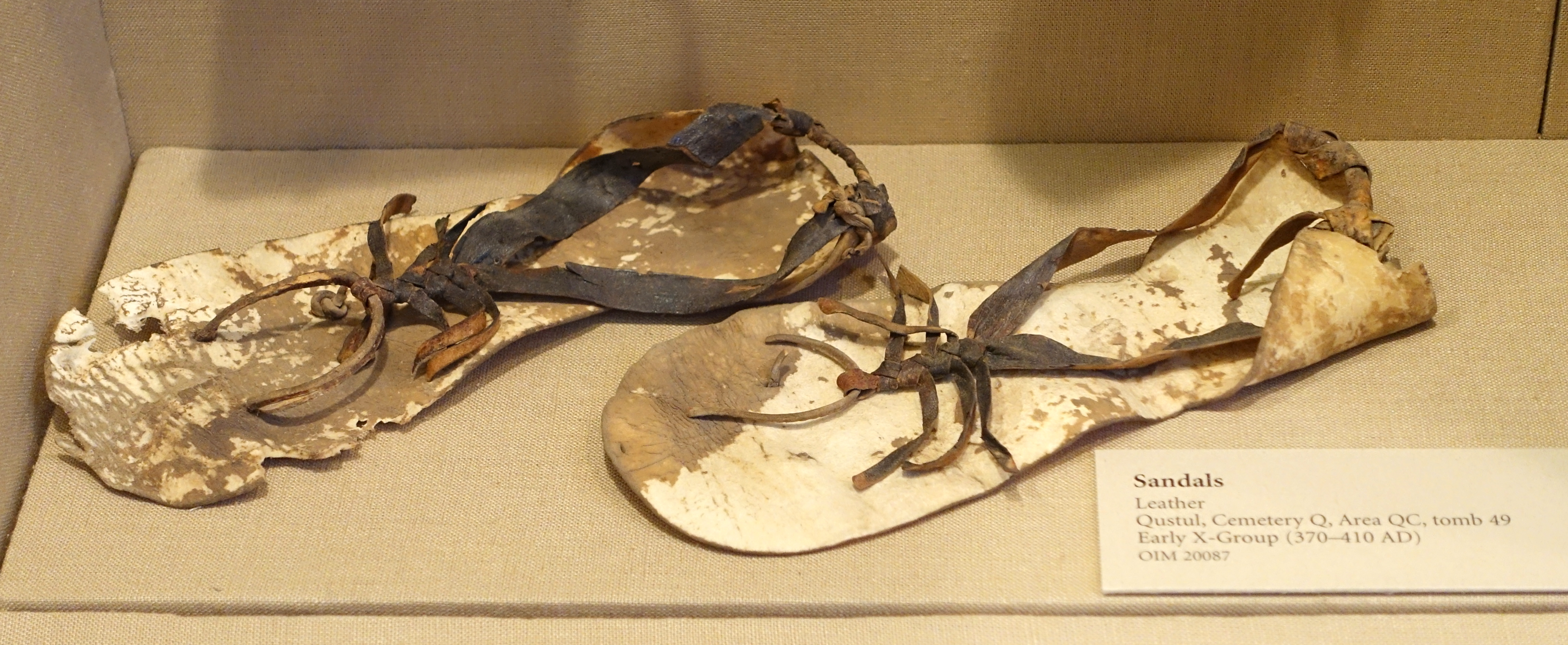
Sandals from Qustul, c. AD 370–410

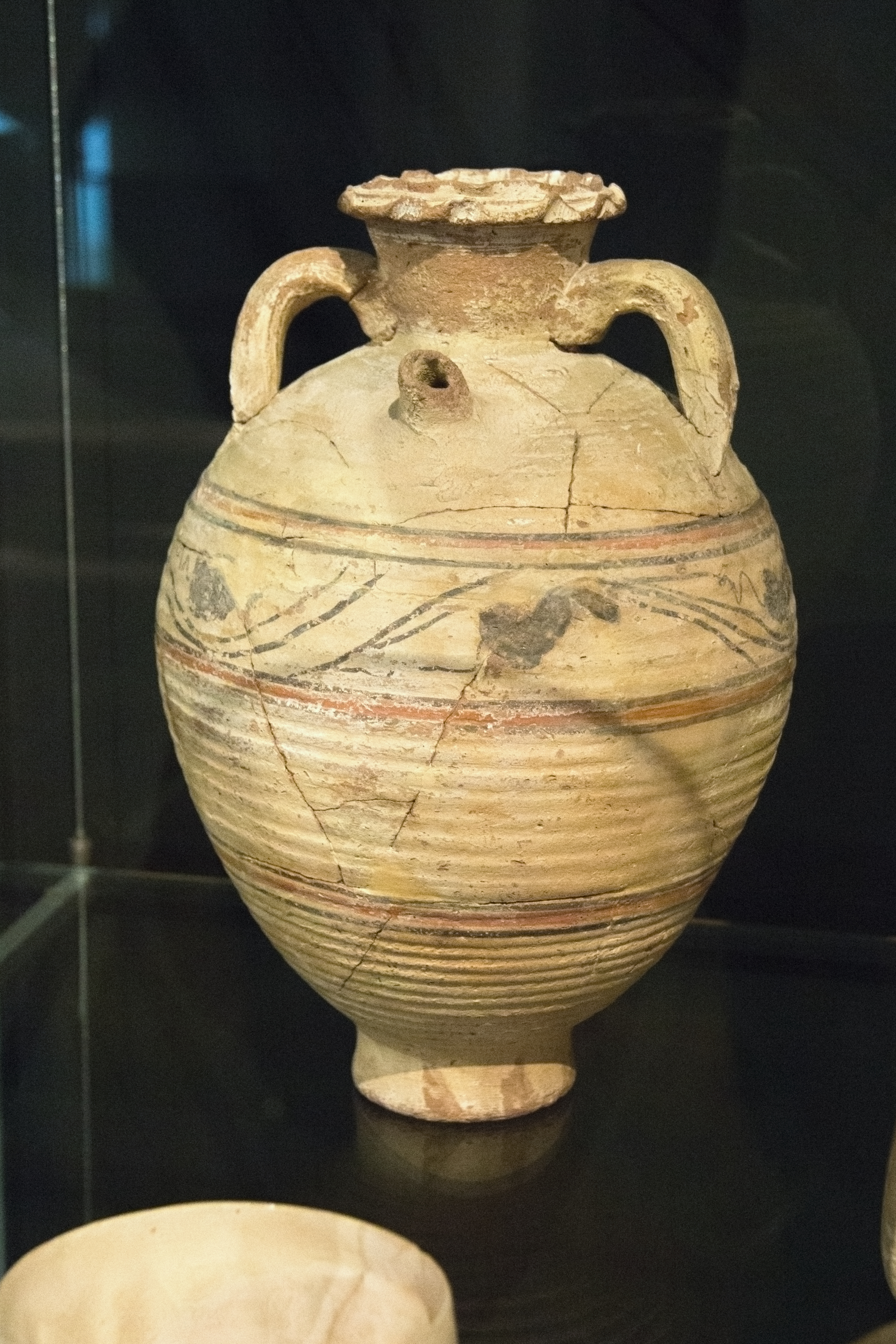
Pottery from X-Group burial, Wadi Qitna and Kalabsha South
