= Lake Idku =

Lake in Egypt

Edko Lake
- بحيرة إدكو (Arabic)
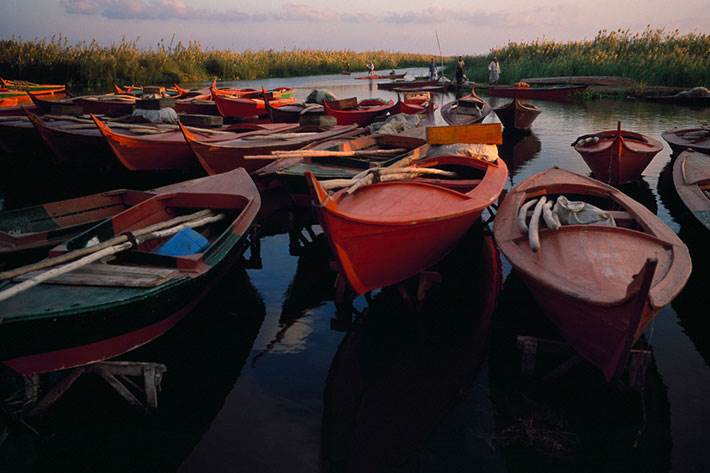
- View of the lake

- Location within Egypt
- Coordinates: 31°15′03″N 30°12′41″E
- Basin countries: Egypt
- Surface area: 62.78 square kilometres (24.24 sq mi)
- Salinity: 488 per mille
- Settlements: Edku

Lake Idku (Arabic: بحيرة إدكو) is one of the lakes in Egypt. Its freshwater area is 62.78 square kilometres (24.24 sq mi) and it connects to the Mediterranean Sea. The lake lies to the west of the city of Edku.

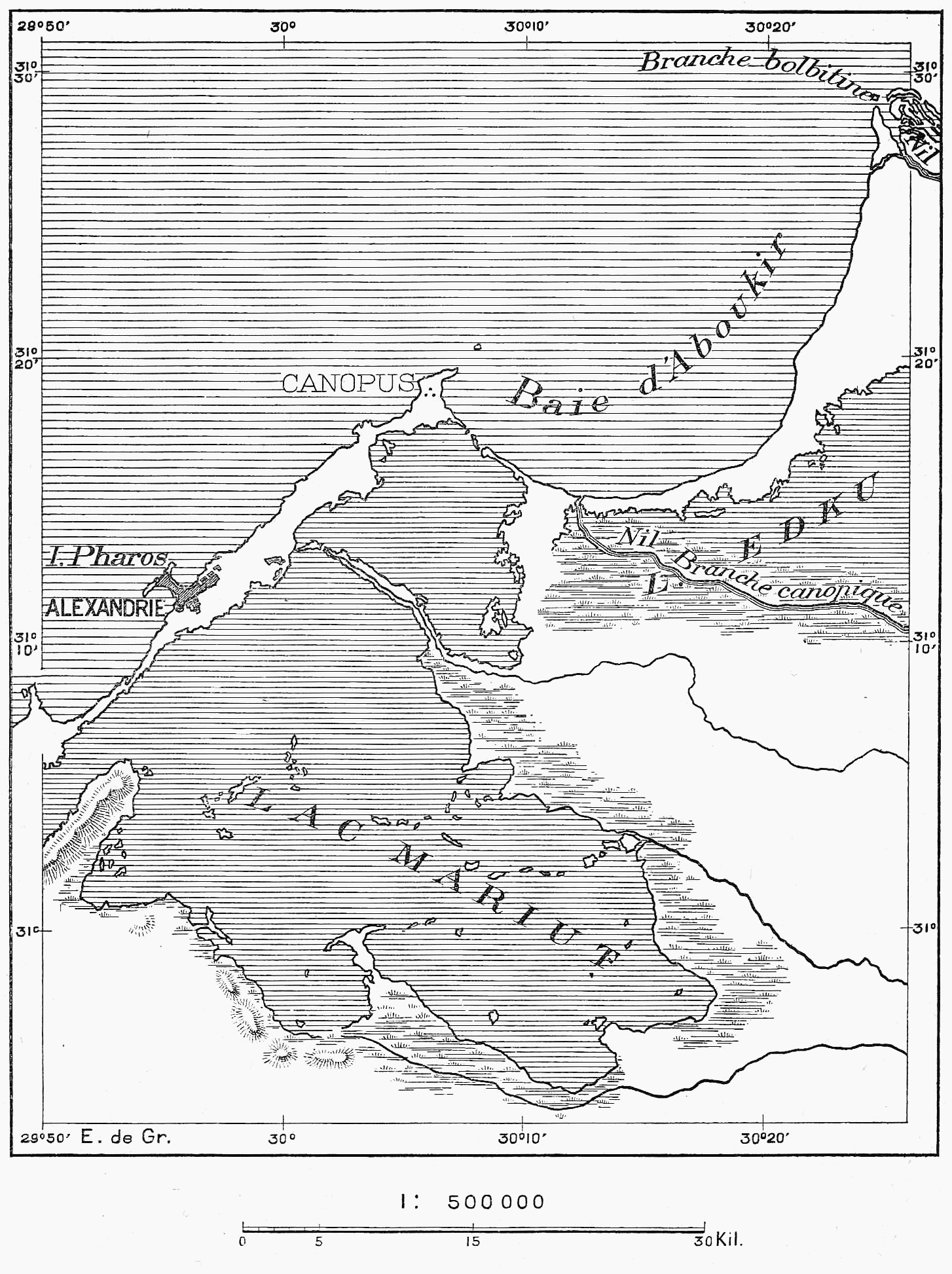
Lake Idku (Edku) in ancient times, when its size was much larger

== See also ==
- List of lakes of Egypt
