= Toshka Lakes =

Lakes in Egypt

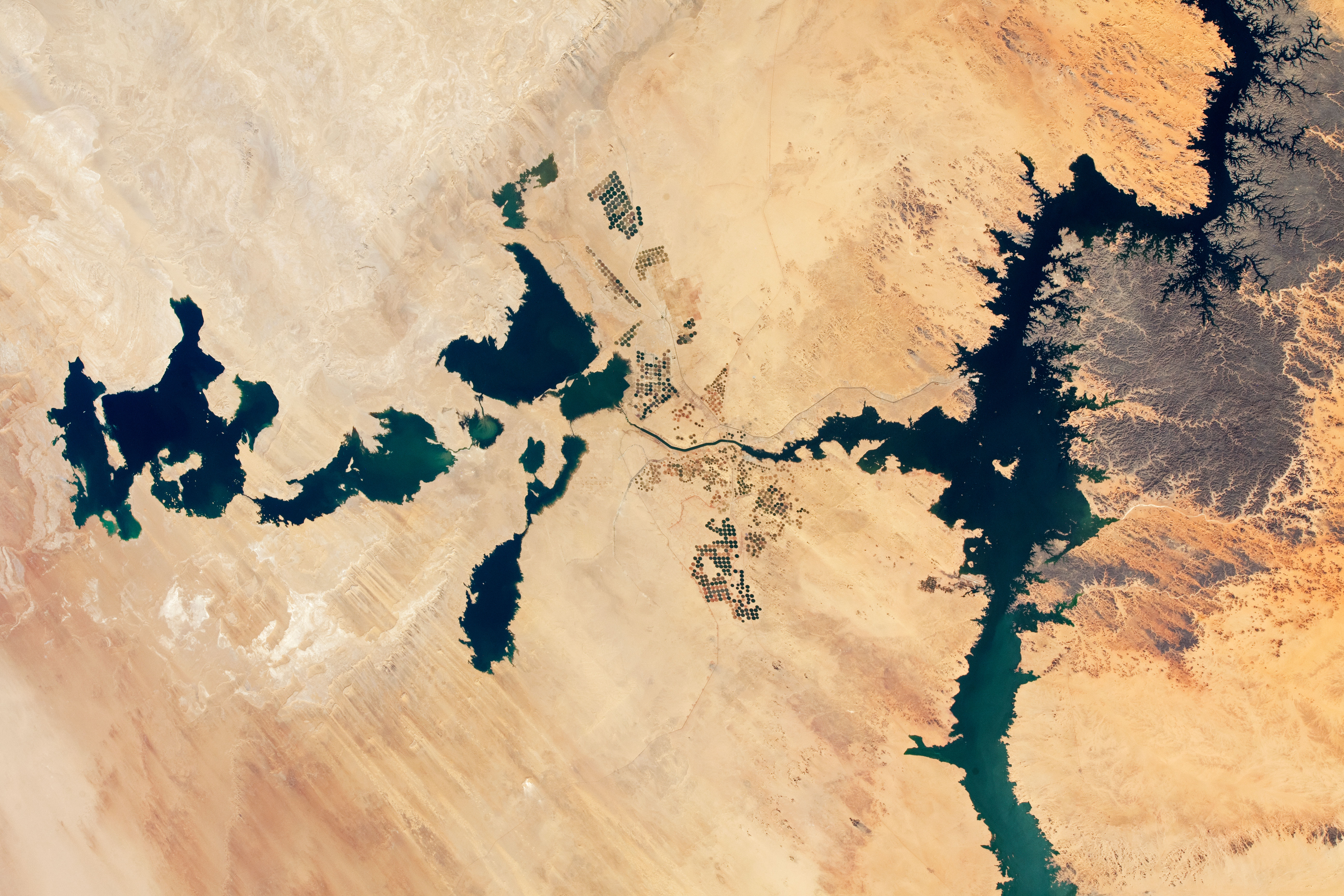
- The Toshka lakes and Lake Nasser in 2021

- Location within Egypt
- Location: New Valley Governorate
- Coordinates: 23.1°N 30.9°E
- Type: Endorheic lake
- Primary inflows: Nile-Lake Nasser via Sadat Canal
- Basin countries: Egypt
- Surface area: 1,450 km^{2} (560 sq mi) (2000); 307 km^{2} (119 sq mi) (Lowest, 2012); 2,321 km^{2} (896 sq mi)(2022)
- Water volume: 25.26 km^{3} (10 cu mi) (2000)

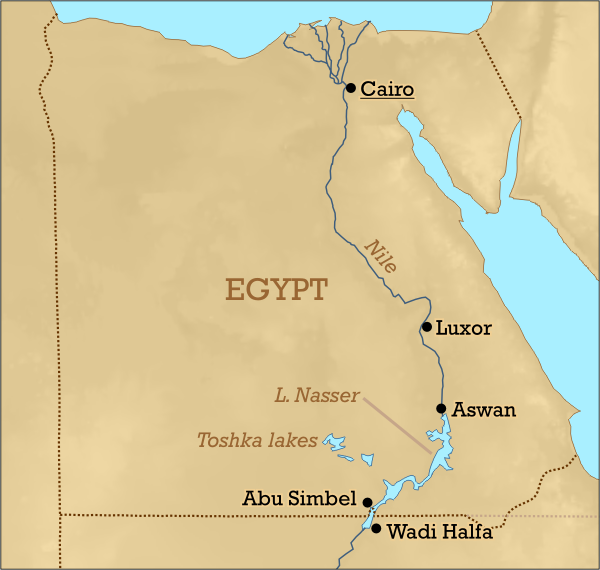
Location of the Toshka Lakes and Lake Nasser in Egypt.

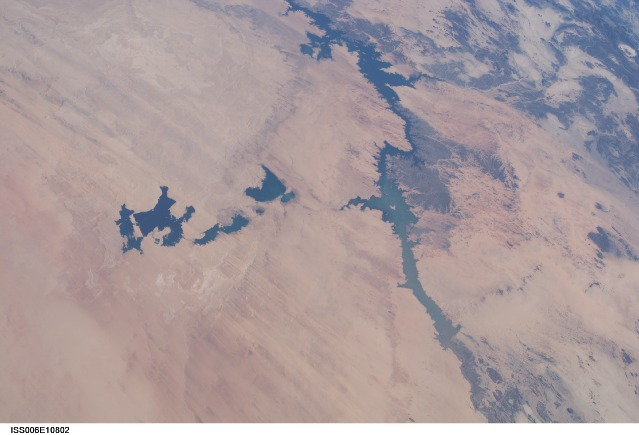
Photograph of the Toshka Lakes taken Dec. 2002 from the International Space Station looking NE. Lake Nasser is the very long lake that lies east of the lakes. Wadi Toshka is the large bay in Lake Nasser directly east of the Toshka lakes. The Western Desert of Egypt can be seen west of Lake Nasser

Toshka Lakes (Arabic: بحيرات توشكى, Egyptian Arabic pronunciation: [boħeˈɾæːt ˈtoʃkæ]) is the name given to recently formed endorheic lakes in the Sahara Desert of Egypt. Their presence is caused by periodic overflow from Lake Nasser.

The presence of the depression helped establish the Toshka New Valley Project, made possible by the Sheikh Zayed Canal, which starts from the Mubarak pump station to raise water from the creek of Lake Nasser to the canal, and whose aim is to develop the southern valley area.

== Etymology ==
There are two opinions regarding the origin of the name "Toshka". The first is that the word "toshka" is made up of two syllables: "toshi" or "tosho", and "ki", "ke", or "ka". "Toshi" is the name of the stump plant, a type of medicinal herb that grows in the valley, and "ki" means "the place", "the house", or "the homeland" in the Nubian dialect of the region. Toshka in its entirety then means "the home of the Ghubeira plant."

The second opinion, which is more widely accepted, is that the lakes are named after a Nubian village (Old Nubian: ⲧⲱϣⲕⲉⲁ) which existed in the region until it was flooded after the construction of the Aswan High Dam. The word "toshka" consists of two syllables.

In the past, the Toshka region included two villages, one east of the Nile, "Toshka East" and the other west of the Nile, "Toshka West." The residents used Nile boats to move between the two villages. The two new ones have the same name "Toshka East" and "Toshka West". A new city was built in remembrance of the village.

== History ==
=== Battle of Toski ===
In the year 1889, a famous battle took place in the Toshka region between the British campaign and the army of the Mahdist State. Mahdist revolutionaries marched from Sudan under the leadership of Abd al-Rahman al-Nujumi, proclaiming that they were ridding the Nile Valley of the corruption of the Turkish and British rulers, spread the Mahdist faith to Egypt, and to free Ahmed Orabi from prison.

=== Aswan High Dam ===
The Aswan High Dam, constructed in Egypt in 1964–1968, created Lake Nasser. It was designed with a maximum water level of 183 metres (600 ft) above sea level. As a precaution against any unexpected rise in Lake Nasser's water level, a spillway and channel were built in 1978. The channel has the potential to divert water from the reservoir to the Toshka basin, which is located outside the Nile basin. This design relieves dam pressure and protects downstream areas from massive flooding. The canal was made through a spillway channel that was dug starting from Khor Toshka branching from Lake Nasser and passing through the Toshka Valley in the Western Desert until it connects to the depression.

=== Formation ===
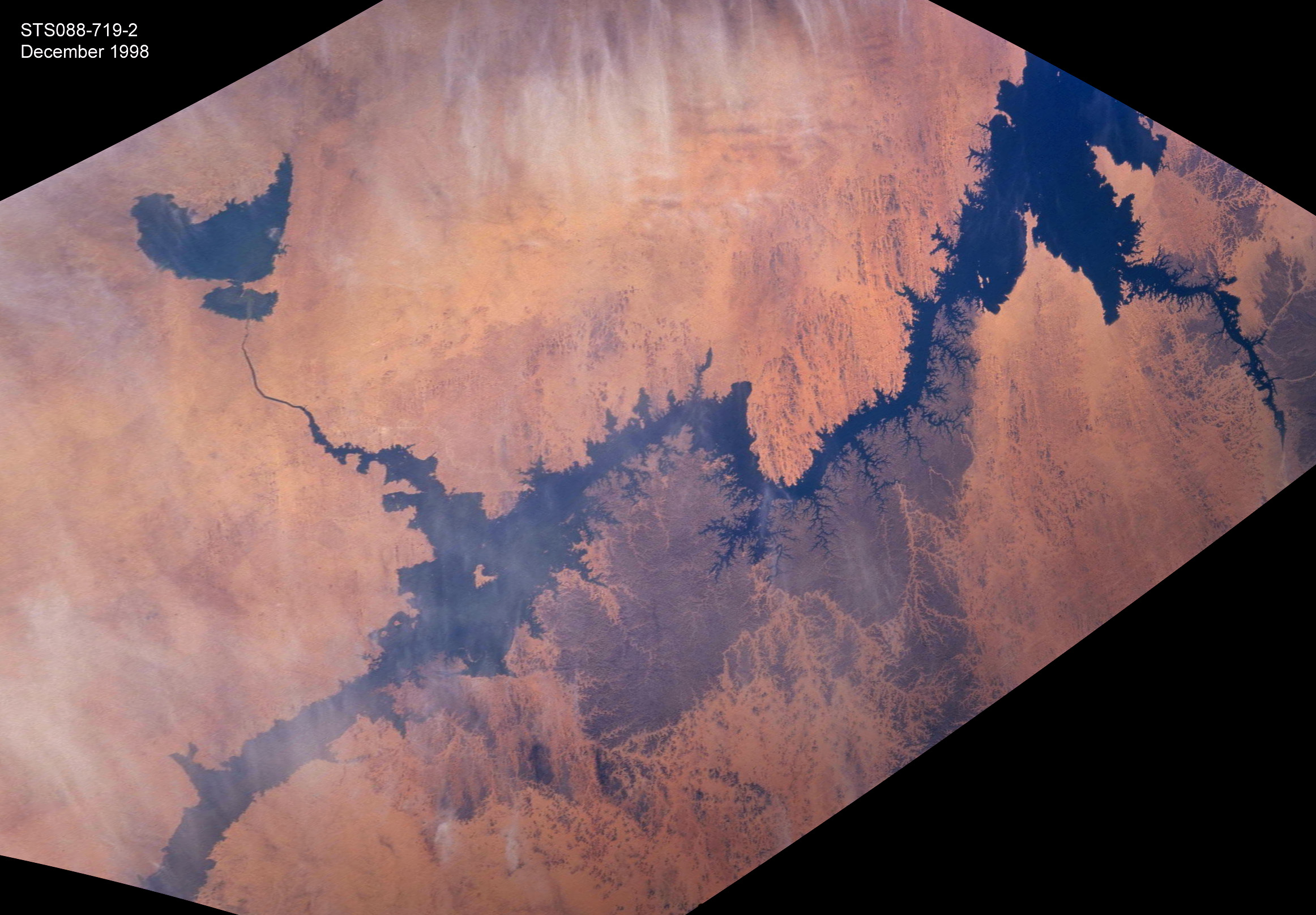
The formation of Toshka Lakes (November 1998).

In 1998, Ethiopia experienced mass flash floods and river floods. Excess water coming in from Ethiopia's highlands put strain on the river Nile and put the flood control plan of the Aswan High Dam to the test. For the first time, the massive reservoir reached its highest level of 183 meters above sea level in September. Excess water started being released from Lake Nasser by overflow into a hollow at the south end of the Eocene limestone plateau. During September and October, the basin received between 32 and 98 million cubic meters of water per day.

Astronauts on the ISS began noticing the first, easternmost lake growing in November 1998. By late 1999, three additional lakes formed successively westward, and the westernmost lake started forming sometime between September 2000 and March 2001. These lakes are not yet named individually.

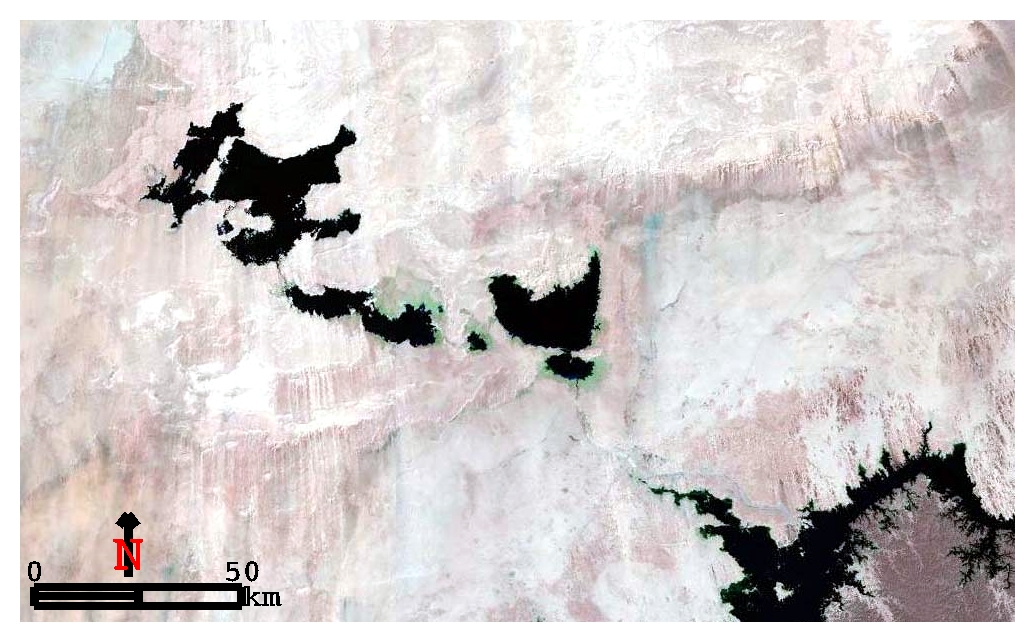
Landsat mosaic of Toshka Lakes (April 2003). False-color image, with bands 7-4-2 assigned to R-G-B.

It was estimated that in total, the Toshka Lakes cover approximately 1300 square kilometers (502 mi^{2}). The levels of the lakes as of 2006 were lower than in 2001, and areas of wetlands and sand dunes have formed between the former and present shorelines. A minor lake downstream of the three larger lakes has completely dried out. The altitude of the lake surfaces vary between 175 metres (574 ft) for the one closest to Lake Nasser to 144 metres (472 ft) for the one furthest downstream.

=== Decline ===
By the late 2000s, the Toshka region experienced an increase in agricultural activity, with farmers using water from Lake Toshka and pumps from Lake Nasser for agricultural purposes. The region saw some economic growth as a result of the increased agricultural activity, and a new city was built to support the Toshka Agricultural Project located northeast of the Sheikh Zayed Canal. The city of New Toshka was established by Presidential Decree No. 199 of 2000 and its location modified by Presidential Decree No. 268 of 2006 with the aim of creating an integrated urban community.

By 2006, Lake Toshka's water levels began to decline rapidly, exposing large areas of dry land. The amount of stored water had been reduced by 50%. By June 2012, water filled only the lowest parts of the main western and eastern basins, covering a surface area of 307 square kilometers, an 80% decrease compared to 2002. The central basin is almost completely devoid of water and the rest of the lakes had mostly dried up due to low flow in the river. By 2017 and 2018, the lakes were nearly completely dry, leaving only small remnants of water in the western basins.

=== Sudan Floods ===
The 2019 summer rainfall in Sudan and South Sudan was significant enough to raise the water level in Lake Nasser, which allowed the eastern Toshka basin to start refilling. This was followed by the record-breaking floods that occurred in Sudan in 2020. These floods led to the highest water level ever recorded in Lake Nasser. The following year, in 2021, another flood occurred in Sudan. Then, due to the 2022 Sudanese floods, Lake Nasser approached record levels once again, causing the Toshka Lakes to fill rapidly.

The filling of the Toshka Lakes in 2022 resulted in the highest water levels ever recorded in the area, and it also caused the formation of new lakes in depressions located to the north and south of the eastern basin. The area covered by the original lakes increased substantially above the levels seen in 2001, gaining 3 more lakes on the eastern side. This increase in water levels has had a significant impact on the agricultural areas in the region, which have grown considerably due to the abundance of water. As a result, the Toshka agriculture project has benefited greatly from the increased water supply, and the region's economy has improved due to growth in the agricultural industry.

== Geography ==
The new lake system is endorheic, meaning the waters never flow out to the sea. The Nile-sourced water creates the lakes and helps to recharge the underlying aquifer; however, desert temperatures cause very high levels of evaporation. Although the new lakes already contain an impressive number of fish, these high evaporation levels will make the waters increasingly saline over time, reducing fish stocks and harming the newly established flora and fauna.

The Toshka Hollow lies within the seismically active Nubian Swell. The Egyptian government is developing the surrounding region, also known as the "Toshka Project" or "New Valley Project".

== See also ==
- New Valley Project
- New Valley Governorate
- Lakes of Egypt
