= New Valley Project =

System of canals in Egypt

Coordinates: 22.63°N 31.12°E

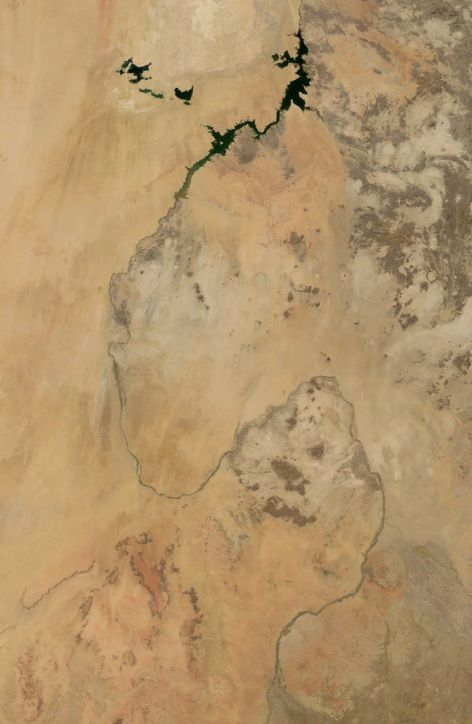
- Satellite view of the Toshka lakes, Sadat canal and the New Valley Project
- Interactive map of New Valley Project

History
- Modern name: Toshka Project
- Original owner: Egyptian Government
- Construction began: 1997

The New Valley Project or Toshka Project consists of building a system of canals to carry water from Lake Nasser to irrigate part of the sandy wastes of the Western Desert of Egypt, which is part of the Sahara Desert.

== History ==
In 1997, the Egyptian government decided to develop a new valley (as opposed to the existing Nile Valley) where agricultural and industrial communities would develop. It has been an ambitious project which was meant to help Egypt cope with its rapidly growing population.

== Project ==
The canal inlet starts from a site 8 km to the north of Toshka Bay (Khor) on Lake Nasser. The canal is meant to continue westwards until it reaches the Darb el-Arbe'ien route, then northwards along the Darb el- Arbe'ien to the Baris Oasis, covering a distance of 310 km. But as of April 2012, the canal is still 60 km short of the Baris Oasis. The Mubarak Pumping Station in Toshka is the centerpiece of the project and was inaugurated in March 2005. It pumps water from Lake Nasser to be transported by way of a canal through the valley, with the idea of transforming 2340 km^{2} (588,000 acres) of desert into agricultural land. The Toshka Project has now been revived by President Abdel Fattah el-Sisi. Half of the land will be given to college graduates, 1 acre each, funded by the Long Live Egypt Fund.

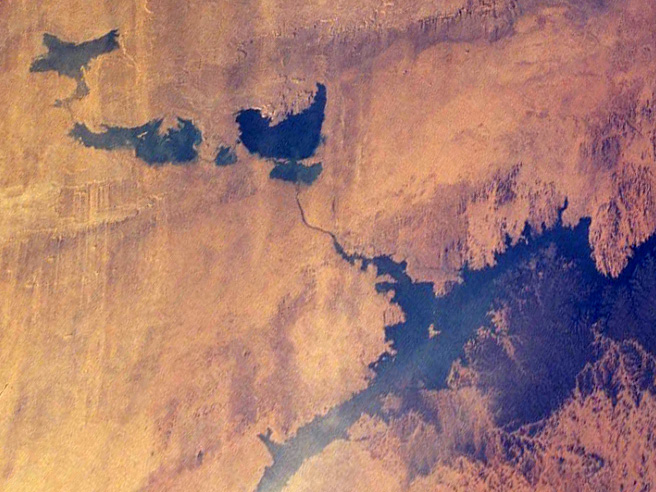
Satellite view detail

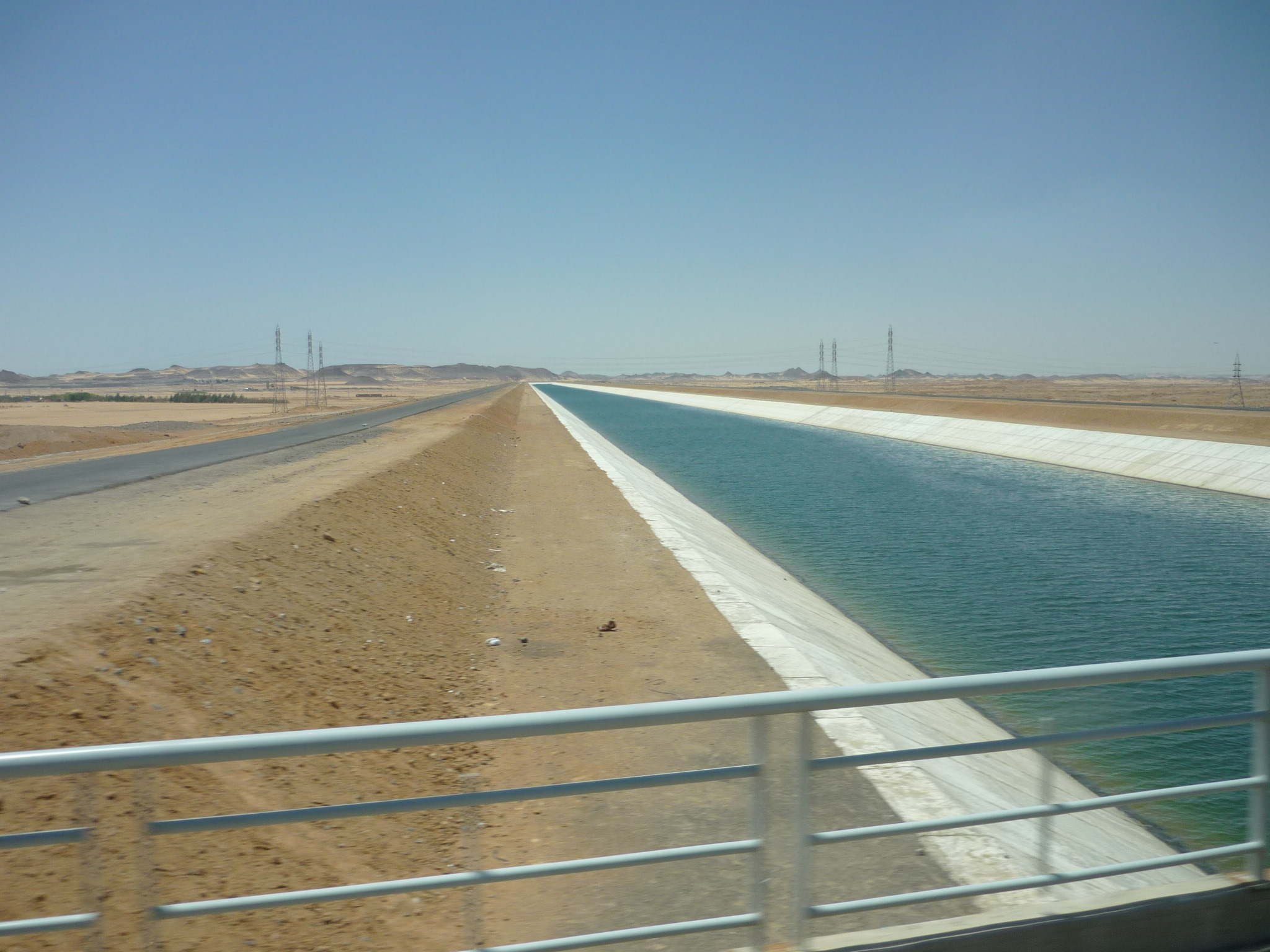
Sheikh Zayed canal of New Valley project, Libyan desert, Egypt

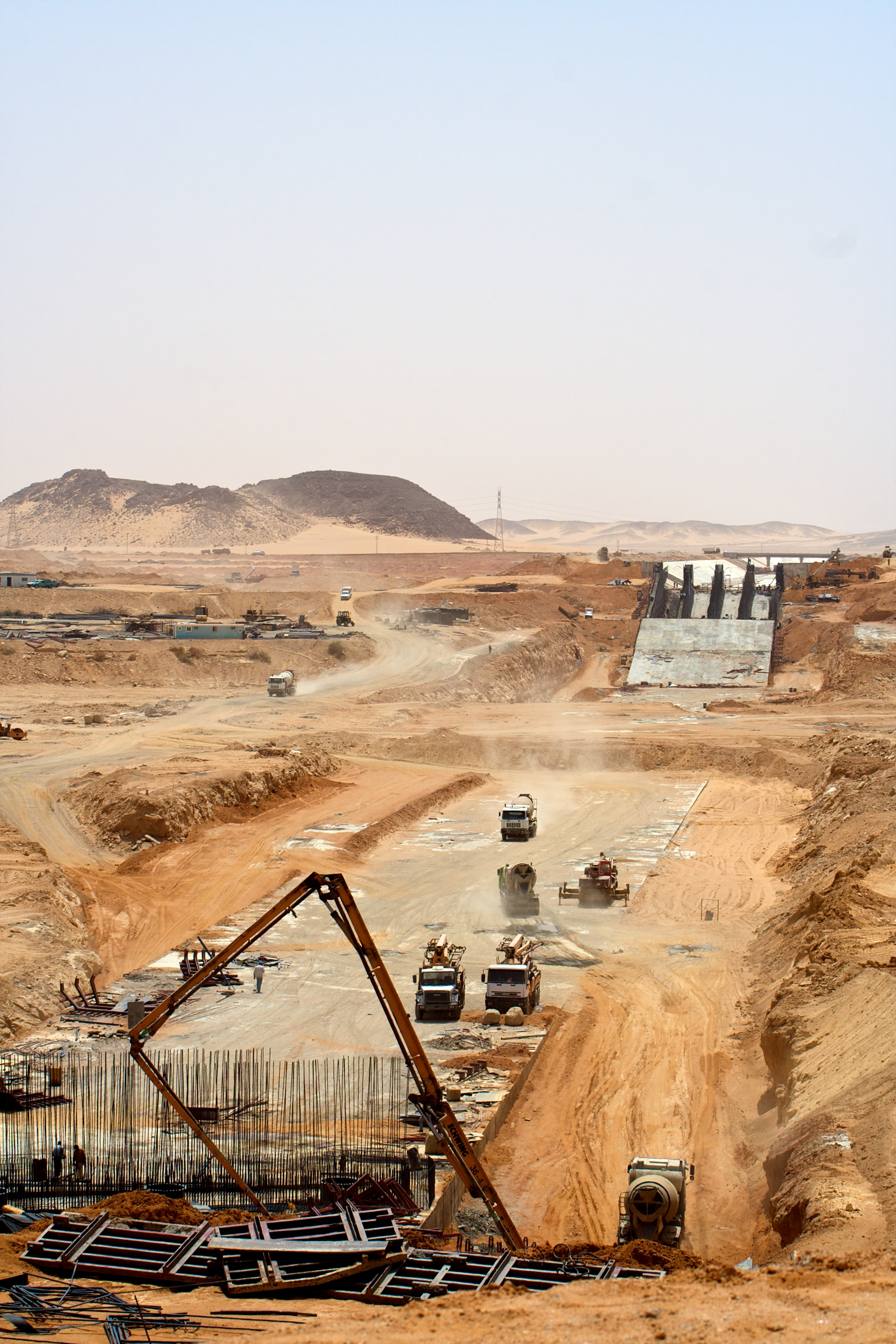
Construction site (2009) of the syphon that delivers water from the new valley project under the toshka spillway

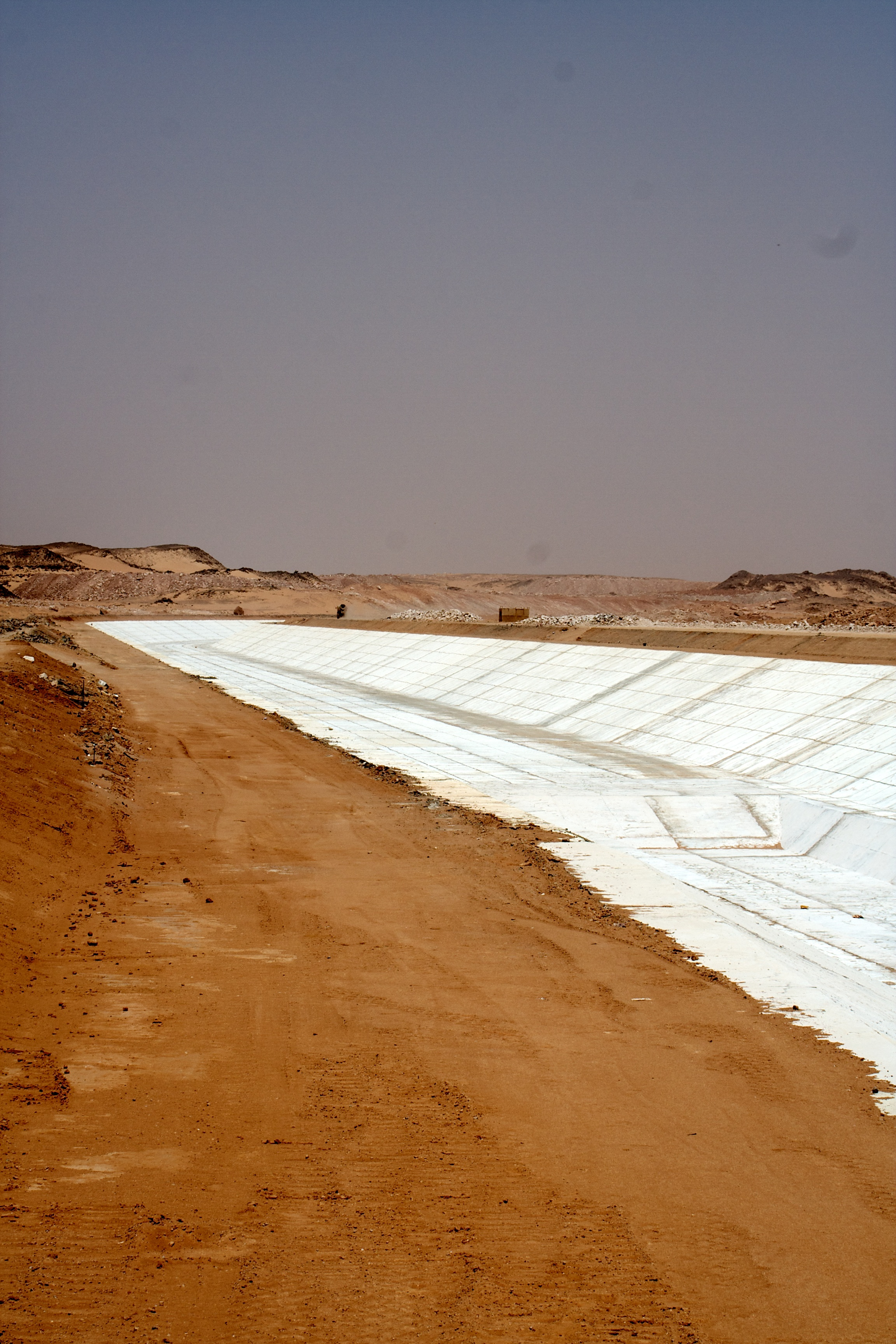
Toshka Canal

The essential problem is that the Western Desert's high saline levels and the presence of underground aquifers in the area act as a major obstacle to any irrigation project. As the land is irrigated, the salt would mix with the aquifers and would reduce access to potable water. There is also the difficulty that the clay minerals found in the soil are posing technical problems to the big wheeled structures moving around autonomously to irrigate the land. Often their wheels get stuck in a little bowl created by wet clay that dried, and the irrigation machines come to a standstill. The only objective met up to April 2012 is the diversion of water from Lake Nasser into what little of the Sheikh Zayed Canal has been built.

The Toshka Lakes are a by-product of the rising level of Lake Nasser and lie in the same general region as much of the New Valley Project.

== See also ==
- New Valley Governorate
- Baris Oasis
- Kharga Oasis
- Dakhla Oasis
- Farafra Oasis
- Bahariya Oasis
- Siwa Oasis
