= Walter Bryan Emery =

British Egyptologist

Walter Bryan Emery

Walter Bryan Emery, CBE, FBA (2 July 1903 – 11 March 1971) was a British Egyptologist. His career was devoted to the excavation of archaeological sites along the Nile Valley. During the Second World War, he served with distinction as an officer in the British Army and, in the immediate aftermath, in the Diplomatic Service, both still in Egypt.

== Early life ==
Walter Bryan Emery was born in New Brighton, Cheshire, the son of Walter Thomas Emery – the head of a technical college – and Beatrice Mary Emery. Emery was educated at St Francis Xavier's College, Liverpool.

On leaving school, he was briefly apprenticed to a firm of marine engineers. His training there resulted in his becoming an excellent draftsman, a skill which produced the brilliantly executed line drawings that permeated his later published works on Egyptology, and which was similarly influential in his wartime military career.

== Field archaeologist ==
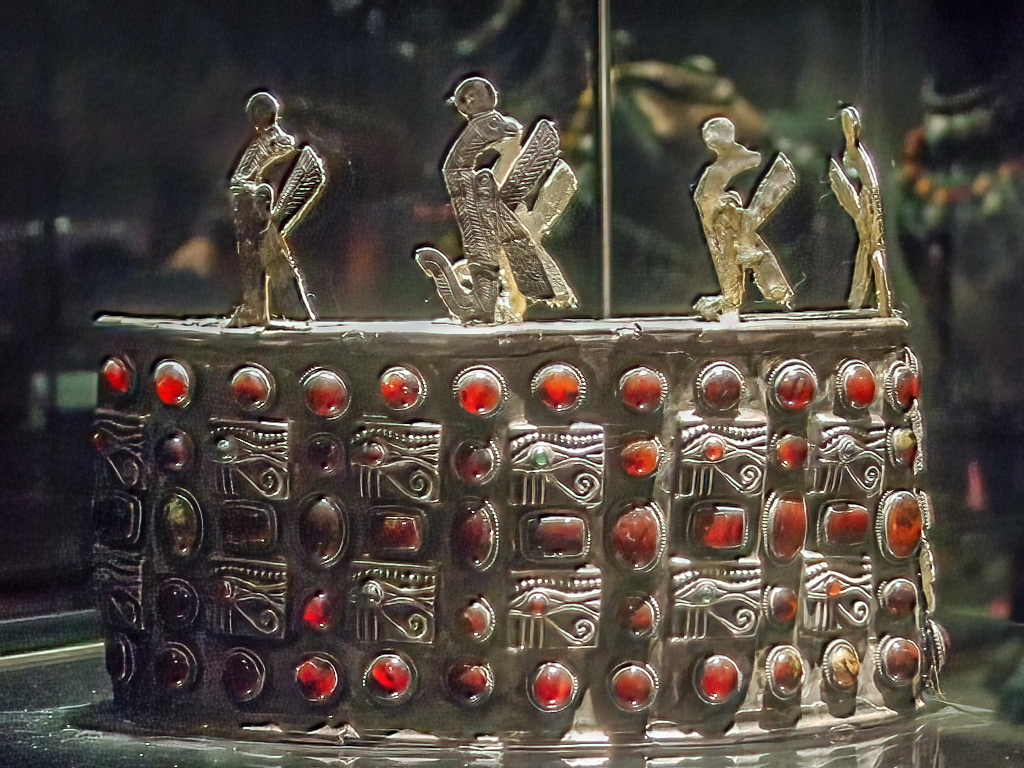
The crown of a local Nubian king who ruled between the collapse of the Meroitic dynasty in 350 or 400 AD and the founding of the Christian kingdom of Nubia in 600 AD. Found in Tomb 118 at Ballana in Lower Nubia by Emery.

After preliminary training at the Liverpool Institute of Archaeology, Emery made his first trip to Egypt as an assistant on the staff of the Egypt Exploration Society, in 1923. There he participated in the excavation of Amarna, the ancient city in Middle Egypt founded by the pharaoh Akhenaton.

By 1924, he was already field director of Sir Robert Mond's excavations at Thebes for the University of Liverpool. He made several clearings, restorations and protective operations into a score of tombs at Sheikh Abd el-Qurna. Between 1924 and 1928, continuing as Director of the Mond Expedition, he worked on excavations at Nubia, Luxor and Thebes.

In 1929 he was appointed field director of the Archaeological Survey of Nubia under the auspices of the Egyptian Government Service of Antiquities, with authority to explore and excavate all ancient sites in Nubia which were soon to be flooded after the erection of the Aswan Low Dam. Working at Quban, Ballana and Qustul, he excavated the X-Group of tombs dating to the 3rd to 6th century A.D. He was assisted in his work by his wife, Molly. The completion of the excavations of the fortress at Buhen ended his work in Nubia.

He then became director of fieldwork at Luxor and Armant. During the years 1935 to 1939 he was the director of the Archaeological Survey of Nubia. During these years as director, Emery also investigated several early dynastic tombs at Saqqara. While at Saqqara he made the significant discovery of a "zoo" of mummified animal remains.

== War service ==
Emery was commissioned as an Army officer immediately on the outbreak of war, on 12 September 1939. There was no Intelligence Corps at the time, so Emery was commissioned into the General List as a 2nd Lt. (108571). His considerable local knowledge and practical experience was invaluable to those preparing the defence of Egypt against a potential attack from Italian forces to the West and to the South and he was quickly directed to the intelligence desk at General Headquarters (GHQ), British Troops in Egypt, in Cairo. An early preoccupation was to ensure the quantity and quality of mapping to be issued to the mobilised units that were pouring into the kingdom from all quarters of the Empire: the going for vehicles needed to be noted, water-sources, newly installed enemy defences, etc. Emery's training as a draughtsman was a great asset; his work-colleagues at this time included the future general Victor Paley.

By 1942, Emery was a War Substantive (WS) captain, but was serving in the rank of Major. His contribution to the success at Alamein was rewarded with a Mention in Despatches (MiD). At the end of the North African campaign, with the successful landing of Allied troops on mainland Italy, Emery was further recognised with the award of a military MBE, in 1943. In addition, Emery was later promoted to temporary Lt.Col., on taking command of his branch.

After six years, Lt.Col. Emery, MBE, was released from service on 27 November 1945, and his wartime rank was given formal confirmation. Though not unique, his record was nevertheless impressive for an officer with no previous military experience (PME) who was commissioned after the start of the war: to be promoted from Second Lieutenant to Lieutenant-Colonel, and to be awarded an honour in addition, indicated an exceptional contribution that was notable in itself.

In the immediate aftermath of the war, with many archaeological sites still off-limits, Emery accepted a diplomatic post with the British embassy in Cairo. Starting as an Attaché in 1947, he rose to the rank of First Secretary, until his resignation in 1951 to accept an academic role in London.

== Professor of Egyptology ==
In 1951, Emery was appointed Edwards Professor of Egyptian Archaeology and Philology at University College London, a seat he held for nearly two decades, to 1970. He was elected to the British Academy Fellowship in 1959, and in 1969 he was awarded a civil CBE for his contribution to Egyptology, superseding his military MBE.

During the vacations, Emery was able to resume a limited degree of field-work. From the late 1950s, he worked for seven seasons in the Sudan, at Buhen and Qasr Ibrim. Then, in 1964, he returned once more to Saqqara, where he discovered the "enclosure of the sacred animals".

His principal publications are: Great tombs of the 1st dynasty, (3 volumes) 1949–58; Archaic Egypt, 1961; and Egypt in Nubia, 1965.

Walter Emery returned to his beloved Egypt but did not enjoy a long retirement: he was sent to hospital on the 7 March 1971 after having a stroke. Following a second stroke on 9 March, he died in the Anglo-American Hospital in Cairo, on 11 March 1971. He was buried in the Protestant Cemetery in Cairo.

== Bibliography ==
Emery published a number of works, including:

- 1938 ''Excavations at Saqqara - The Tomb of Hemaka. Government Press, Cairo
- 1939 Hor-aha, Cairo
- 1949 Great Tombs of the First Dynasty I, Cairo
- 1954 Great Tombs of the First Dynasty II, London
- 1958 Great Tombs of the First Dynasty III, London
- 1961 Archaic Egypt, Edinburgh
- 1962 A Funerary Repast in an Egyptian Tomb of the Archaic Period, Leiden
