= Lake Nasser =

Reservoir in southern Egypt and northern Sudan

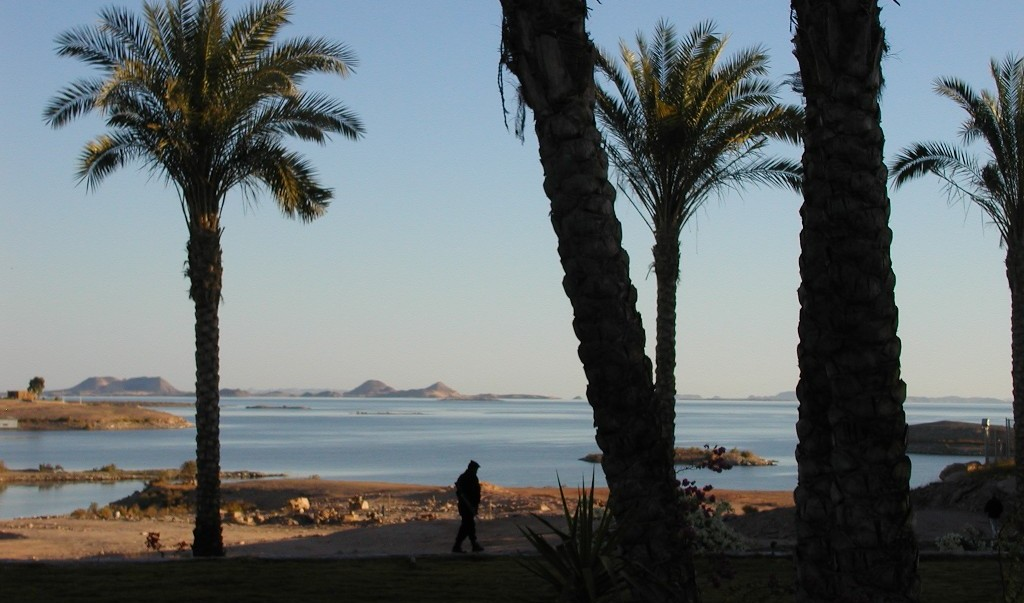
- View from Abu Simbel

- Location within Egypt Location within Africa

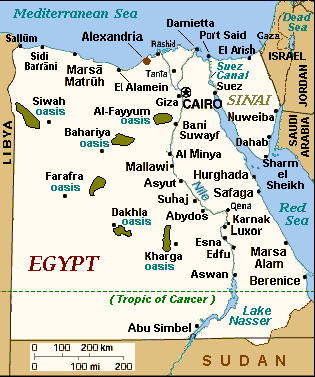
- Map showing the location of the lake
- Coordinates: 22.50°N 31.86°E
- Lake type: Reservoir
- Primary inflows: Nile; Wadi Allaqi
- Primary outflows: Nile; Toshka Spillway
- Basin countries: Egypt, Sudan
- Max. length: 550 km (340 mi)
- Max. width: 35 km (22 mi)
- Surface area: 5,250 km^{2} (2,030 sq mi)
- Average depth: 25.2 m (83 ft)
- Max. depth: 130 m (430 ft)
- Water volume: 132 km^{3} (32 cu mi)
- Shore length^{1}: 7,844 km (25,735,000 ft)
- Surface elevation: 183 m (600 ft)
- ^{1} Shore length is not a well-defined measure.

Lake Nasser (Arabic: بحيرة ناصر Boħeiret Nāṣer, Egyptian Arabic: [boˈħeiɾet ˈnɑːseɾ]) is a large reservoir in southern Egypt and northern Sudan. It was created by the construction of the Aswan High Dam and is one of the largest man-made lakes in the world. The lake has become an important economic resource in Egypt, improving agriculture and supporting robust fishing and tourism industries. The lake is named after Gamal Abdel Nasser, the second President of Egypt.

Strictly speaking, Lake Nasser refers only to the much larger portion of the lake that is in Egyptian territory (83% of the total), with the Sudanese preferring to call their smaller body of water Lake Nubia (Egyptian Arabic: بحيرة النوبية Boħēret Nubeya, [boˈħeːɾet nʊˈbejjæ]). Before its creation, the project faced opposition from Sudan as it would encroach on land in the northern part of the country, where many Nubian people lived who would have to be resettled. In the end, Sudan's land near the area of Lake Nasser was mostly flooded by the lake.

== Physical characteristics ==
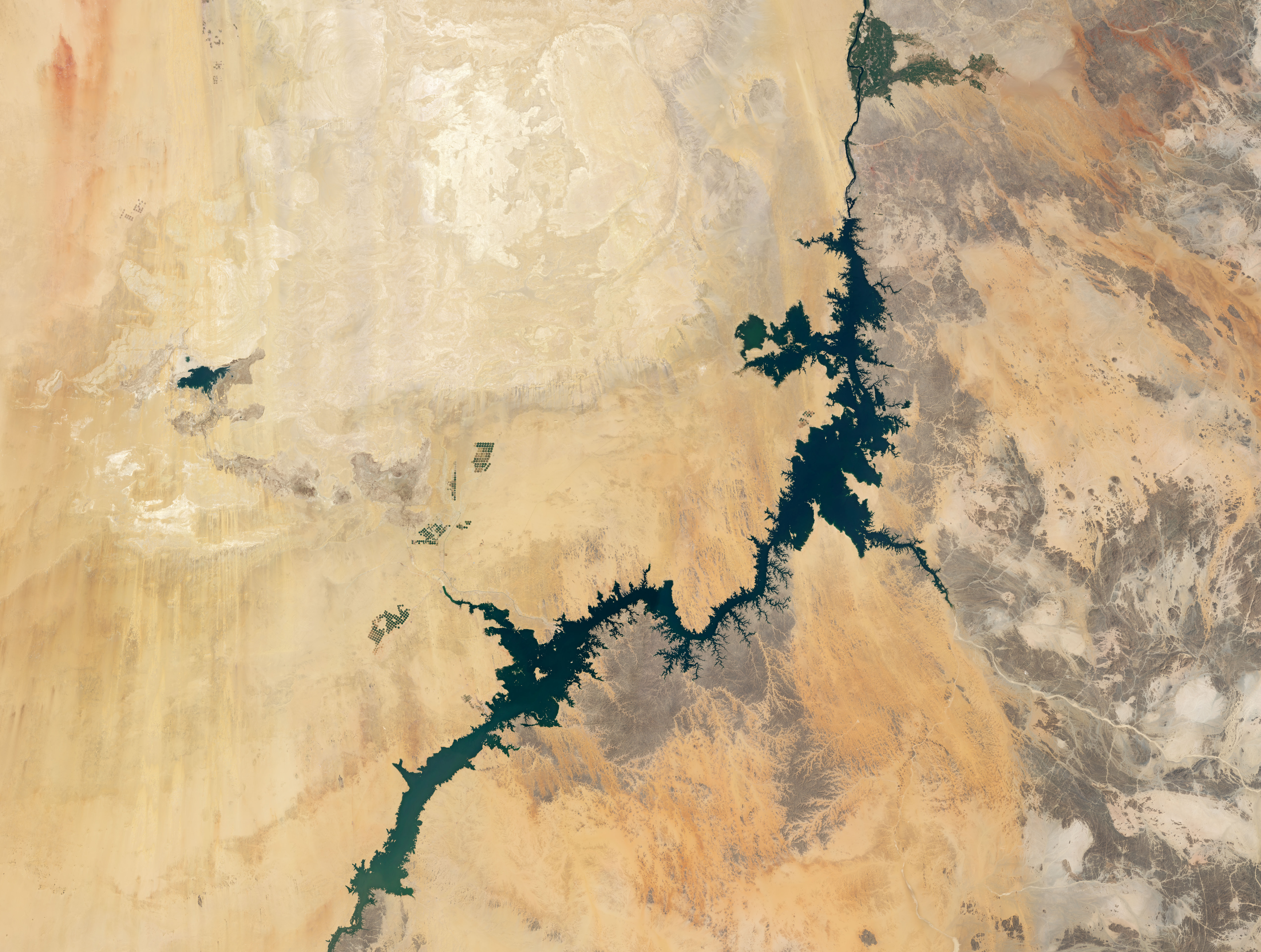
Satellite image of Lake Nasser

The lake is some 479 km (298 mi) long and 16 km (9.9 mi) across at its widest point, which is near the Tropic of Cancer. It covers a total surface area of 5,250 km^{2} (2,030 sq mi) and has a storage capacity of some 132 km^{3} (32 cu mi) of water.

When the water level is high enough, the overflow empties westward into the Toshka Lakes.

== History ==
=== Before the Aswan High Dam and Lake Nasser ===
Before the construction of the Aswan High Dam and the consequent creation of the Lake Nasser, the area that the lake now occupies was a significant part of the region of Nubia, home to several pharaohs of Egypt and empires such as that of the Kush.

=== Construction of the Aswan High Dam 1960–1970 ===
Aswan High Dam

The construction of the Aswan High Dam began in 1960 at the behest of Lake Nasser's namesake and the second president of Egypt, Gamal Abdel Nasser. It was President Anwar Sadat who inaugurated the lake and dam in 1971. Finished in 1970, the Aswan High Dam across the Nile was built to replace the insufficient Aswan Low Dam built in 1902. The goals of the High Dam and the reservoir it created, Lake Nasser, were to create a more stable source of water, to increase agricultural production, and to produce electricity for Egypt.

=== Controversies ===
The construction of the Aswan High Dam and Nasser Lake was host to several controversies related to its effects on the environment and those living in the affected area.

==== Displacement of Nubians ====
As a result of the construction of Aswan High Dam and the subsequent filling of Nasser Lake, tens of thousands of native Nubians were forced to relocate from their homes and migrate elsewhere. Though some have been able to resettle on the shores of the new lake, their original homes have been flooded and lost to the lake.

==== Flooding of ancient ruins and monuments ====
The construction of the Aswan High Dam and Nasser Lake sparked an international movement to preserve the history of the region. Due to the filling of the new Lake Nasser, much of the region would be flooded and as such, the ancient monuments and artifacts that lay there would have been lost. Due to this, an international effort was made to rescue and relocate many of the ancient sites and artifacts that were threatened which culminated in the International Campaign to Save the Monuments of Nubia led by UNESCO. Though many sites were saved and relocated such as the temples of Kalabsha, Wadi es-Sebua, and Amada, some sites such as the fortress of Buhen were unable to be rescued and now rest underwater in the lake. The most famous of those that were rescued were temples at Abu Simbel which were broken down and relocated safely off the coast of Lake Nasser.

==== Ecological ramifications ====
The damming of the Nile has come with several ecological consequences as the natural flow and processes of the river have been interrupted. One effect has been the interruption of the flow of sediments downstream of the dam, which since ancient times had provided many of the needed nutrients for agriculture downstream. Consequently, Egyptian farmers have been forced to resort to mineral fertilizers to maintain arable land for growing crops. The habitat of several native animal species past Lake Nasser and the Aswan High Dam, such as that of the Nile crocodile, have also been greatly affected as the reduction of water levels that came with the construction of the dam rendered these habitats uninhabitable.

== Economic impacts ==
By providing a reliable source of water for irrigation and agriculture year-round instead of the seasonal and unpredictable floods of the Nile River, Lake Nasser has provided a large boon to the agricultural industry of the Egyptian economy. The agricultural industry employs about 25% of Egypt's population. With the creation of a more stable water supply in Lake Nasser, Egypt's arable land increased by about 30%.

Lake Nasser is home to 52 species of fish, including several species of tilapia, which account for the majority of fish catches, as well as the Nile perch. The lake supports a well-established fishing industry, with thousands of fishing boats operating on the lake and fish-processing facilities located along its shores.

Lake Nasser has become a popular tourist destination for recreational fishing, sightseeing cruises, and many relocated monuments saved from the initial filling of Lake Nasser, especially examples such as the Abu Simbel temples.

The Aswan High Dam which holds Lake Nasser produces about 2.1 gigawatts of hydroelectricity, providing a significant percentage of Egypt's electricity needs (up to half when it was completed in 1970).

== Current and future issues ==
=== Grand Ethiopian Renaissance Dam ===
With the beginning of construction of the Grand Ethiopian Renaissance Dam (GERD) in 2011, Egypt faced the threat of water shortage as the new upstream dam would reduce the amount of water flowing downstream to Lake Nasser. As this flow of water from the Nile into Egypt and Sudan constitutes a major part in their economy, its reduction due to the construction of the GERD could potentially be devastating for the nations. The project was about 90% completed by 2023; staged filling of the reservoir began in 2020. The GERD had already begun affecting Egypt as it has reduced the flow of water down the Nile River and decreased available agricultural land for the country. If Egypt, Sudan, and Ethiopia are unable to work out possible solutions for this water problem, the GERD could pose an existential threat to Lake Nasser, having a destabilizing effect on Egypt and Sudan who rely on it for many sectors in their economies.

== Gallery ==
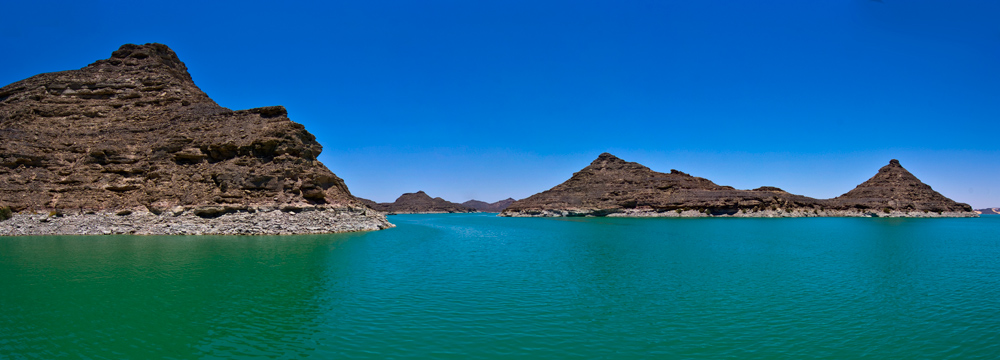
Panoramic view of Lake Nasser

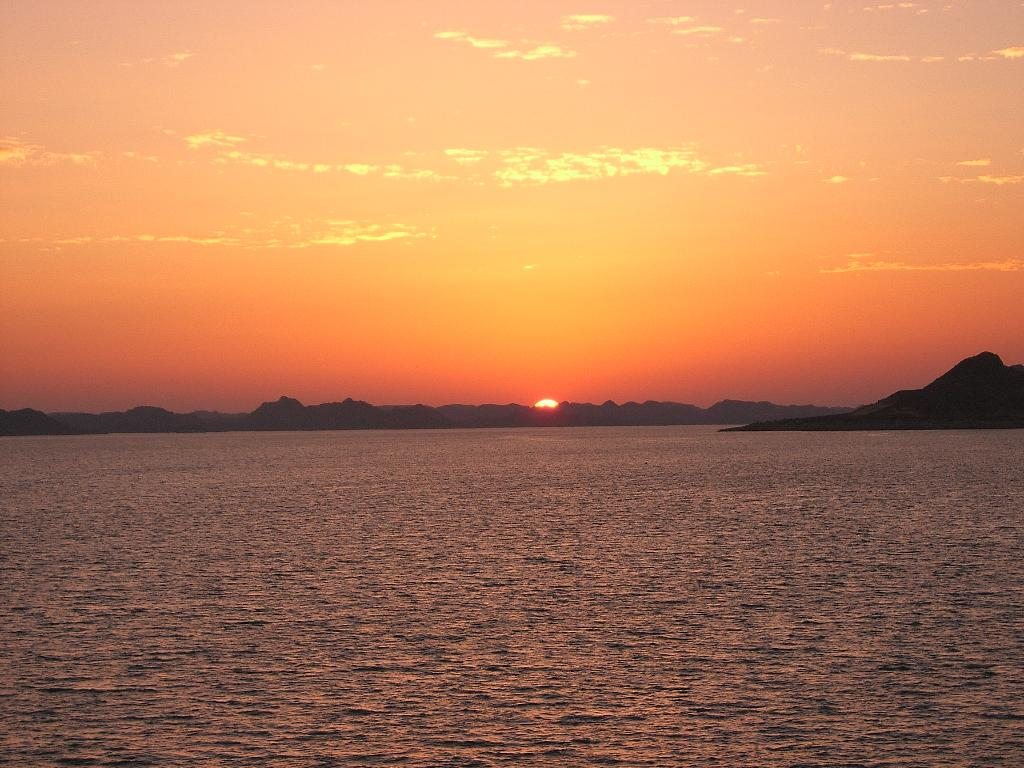
Panoramic view of Lake Nasser at dawn

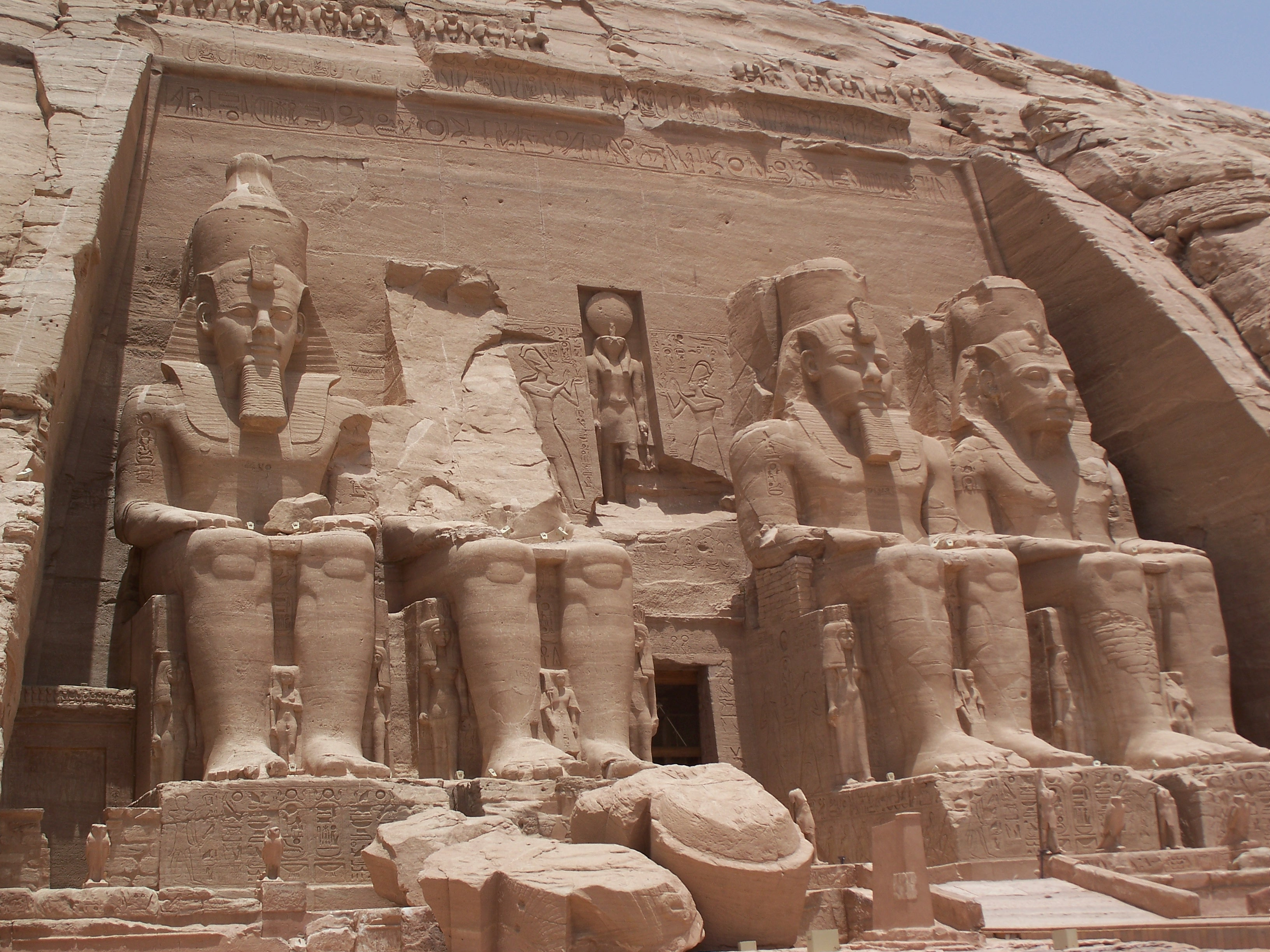
View of Abu Simbel from Lake Nasser

== See also ==
- Aniba (Nubia), a region flooded by Lake Nasser
- Nubia, region flooded by Lake Nasser
- Aswan High Dam, dam that created Lake Nasser
- Toshka Lakes, recently formed endorheic lakes caused by periodic overflow from Lake Nasser
