= George Hart (Egyptologist) =

British Egyptologist (1945–2021)

George Hart (28 October 1945 – 15 February 2021) was a British Egyptologist. He studied classics and Egyptology at University College London. He was a staff lecturer in Egypt and the classical world at the British Museum from 1973 until his retirement in 2004. In addition to his museum work, he also taught Egyptian hieroglyphs and lectured on cruises. He served on the council of the Egypt Exploration Society, on the editorial board of Egyptian Archaeology, and on the committee of the Sudan Archaeological Research Society.

== Selected works ==
- The Pharaohs (2 vols) (2010)
- Pharaohs and Pyramids: A Guide Through Old Kingdom Egypt (1991)
- Egyptian Myths (1990)
- A Dictionary of Egyptian Gods and Goddesses (1986)
