= Usermontu =

Usermontu may refer to:

- Usermontu (vizier), an ancient Egyptian of the late 18th Dynasty
- Usermontu (mummy), a mummified dignitary, mainly known for having a prosthetic pin in his leg
- Usermontu, a First Prophet of Montu during the Ramesside period, buried in Theban tomb TT382
