= Merymose =

Ancient Egyptian official

- Viceroy of Kush
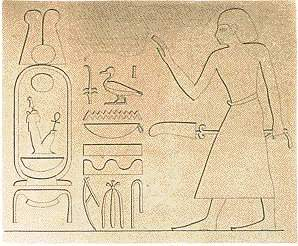
- Viceroy Merymose at Konosso (from Lepsius Denkmahler)
Egyptian name
U6 ms s
- Predecessor: Amenhotep
- Successor: Tuthmosis
- Dynasty: 18th Dynasty
- Pharaoh: Amenhotep III
- Burial: TT383 in Qurnet Murai (Thebes)

Merymose, also Mermose or Merimes, was a Viceroy of Kush under Amenhotep III. He served for almost the entire four decades of that reign.

His titles included: King's son (of Kush), Overseer of the Southern Lands, Overseer of the Gold Lands of Amun, King's Scribe, Overseer of the King's Scribes, Overseer of the Treasury, and Steward of the Peasantry (?)

Merymose likely accompanied Amenhotep III in year 5 on his campaign against Kush. It is possible that at a later time Merymose led a campaign against the people of an area called Ibhet. The people of Ibhet had resisted Egyptian domination and may have even attacked some Egyptian interests. Merymose led an attack against the Nubians. He killed 312 Nubians and captured 740 prisoners.

== People associated with Merymose ==
- Amenemopet, "Scribe of the letters of the king's son". Amenemopet continued to serve under the next Viceroy, and by the reign of Tutankhamen he had become an "adjudant of Kush".
- Huy (or Huwy), "Scribe of the letters of the king's son". Huy may be identical to the Viceroy of the same name under Tutankhamen.
- Nakhtu, "Servant of the King's Son"
- Amenemwia, "Sandal-bearer of the King's Son of Kush Merymose." Known from a stela.
- Penmiam, scribe, shown on a stela appearing before a seated Merymose.

== Burial ==
Merymose was buried in TT383 in Qurnet Murai (Thebes).

Merymose was buried in three anthropoid sarcophagi. The stone for these sarcophagi comes from either Upper Egypt or from Kush. The fragments are spread over several different locations: the British Museum, the Boston Museum of Fine Arts and Vassar College.

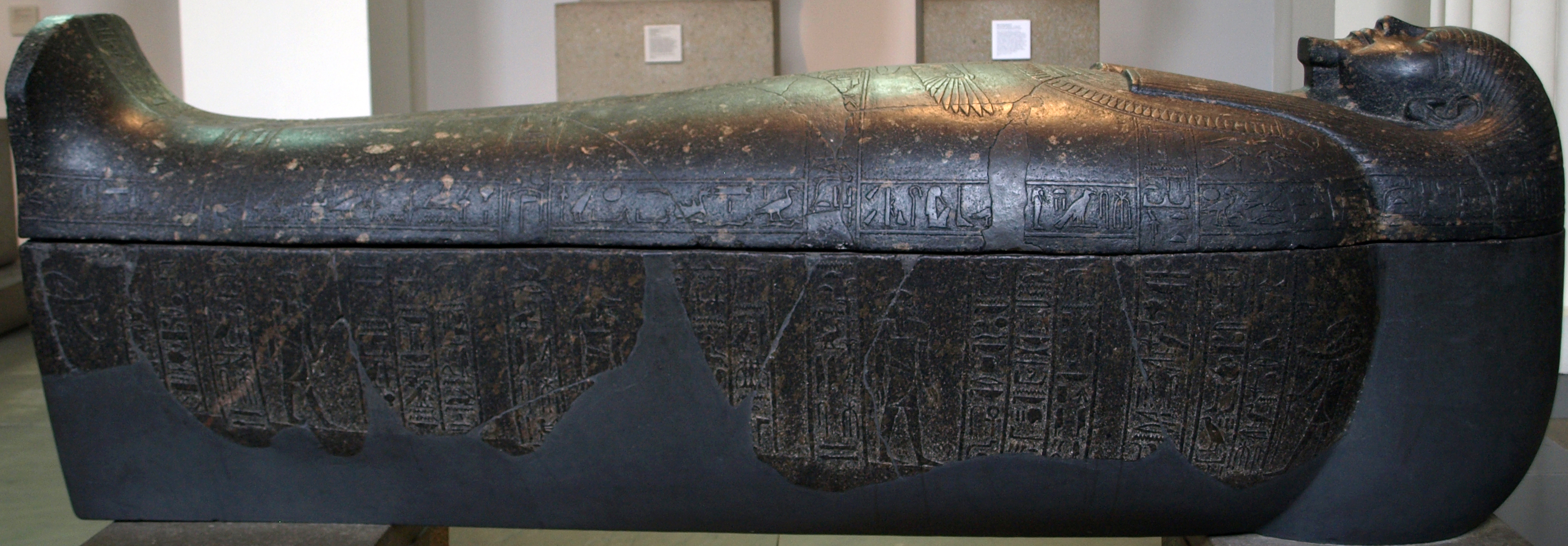
The sarcophagus of Merymose

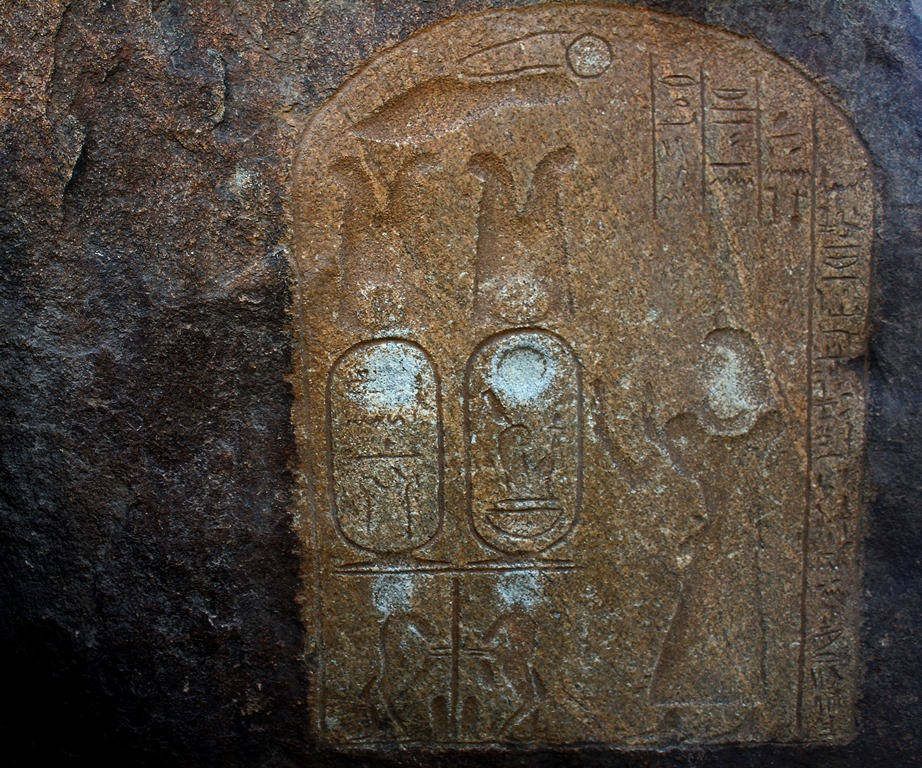
Stela of Merymose at Tombos (Nubia) adoring the cartouche of Amenhotep III
