= Kanisah Kurgus =

Archaeological site in Sudan

Coordinates: 19°13′51″N 33°28′38″E

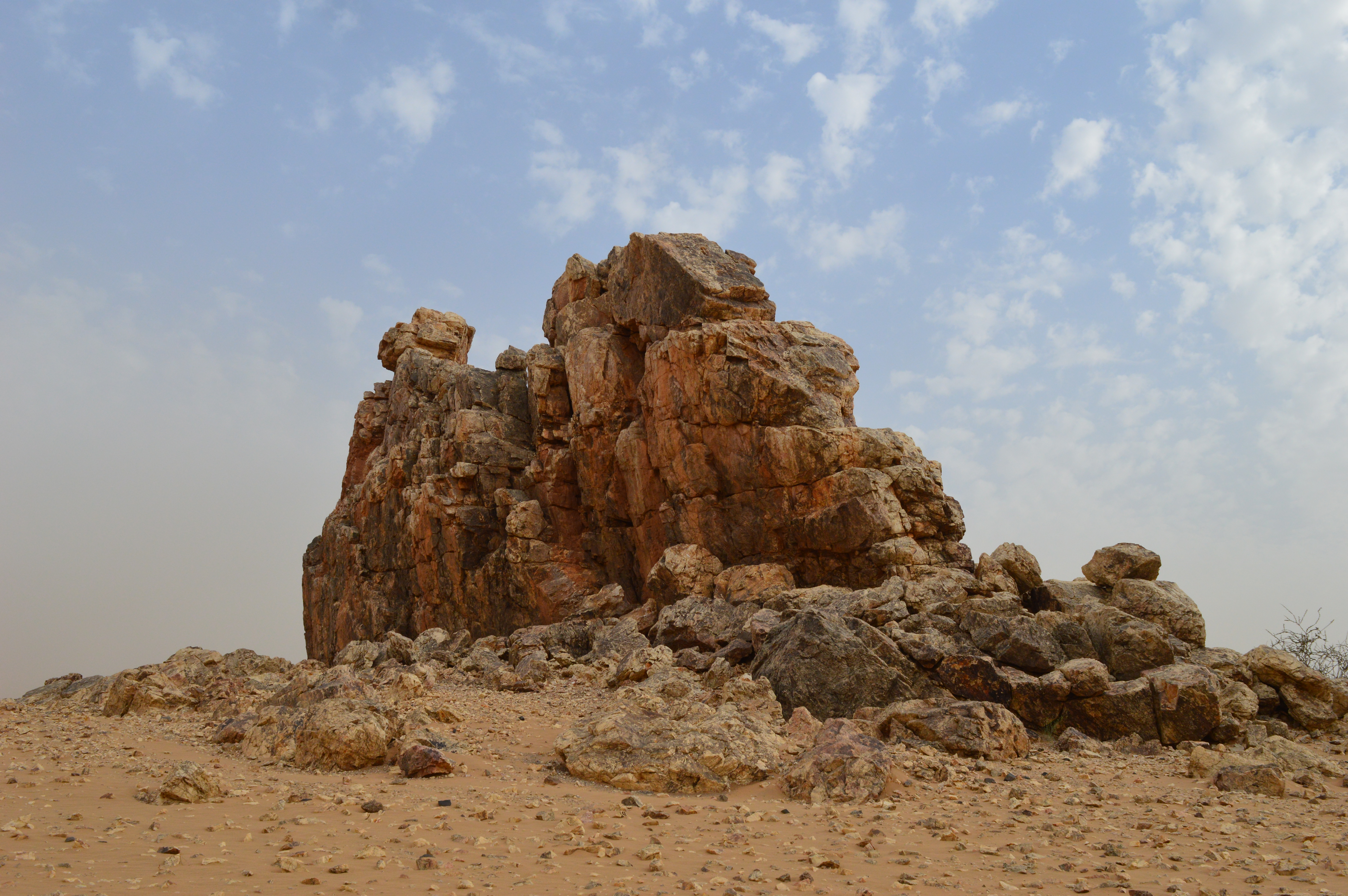
Hagar el-Merwa at Kurgus, marking the southernmost point reached by the New Kingdom in Nubia.

Kanisah Kurgus (also known as Kurgus or Kanisa-Kurgus) is an archaeological site in Sudan, located on the east bank of the Nile between the Fourth and Fifth Cataracts, near Abu Hamed. The area is part of the modern day town Al Kanisah.

The site contains Hagar el-Merwa, an Ancient Egyptian rock art site with inscriptions (boundary stelae) from the reign of Thutmose I and Thutmose III. This site marks the southern border on the Nile of Ancient Egypt during their reigns. The inscription on the rock reads:

As for any [???] who shall transgress (or violate) this stela, which my father Amun has given to me, his chieftains shall be slain, he shall endure in my grasp, the sky shall not rain for him, his cattle shall not calve, there shall be no heir of his on earth.

Kurgus means "yellow" in modern Nubian, and the name likely refers to the yellow sandstone of the region.

== See also ==
- Tombos Stela
- Sudan Archaeological Research Society
