= Tombos (Nubia) =

Island and archaeological site in Sudan

Coordinates: 19.7115°N 30.389°E

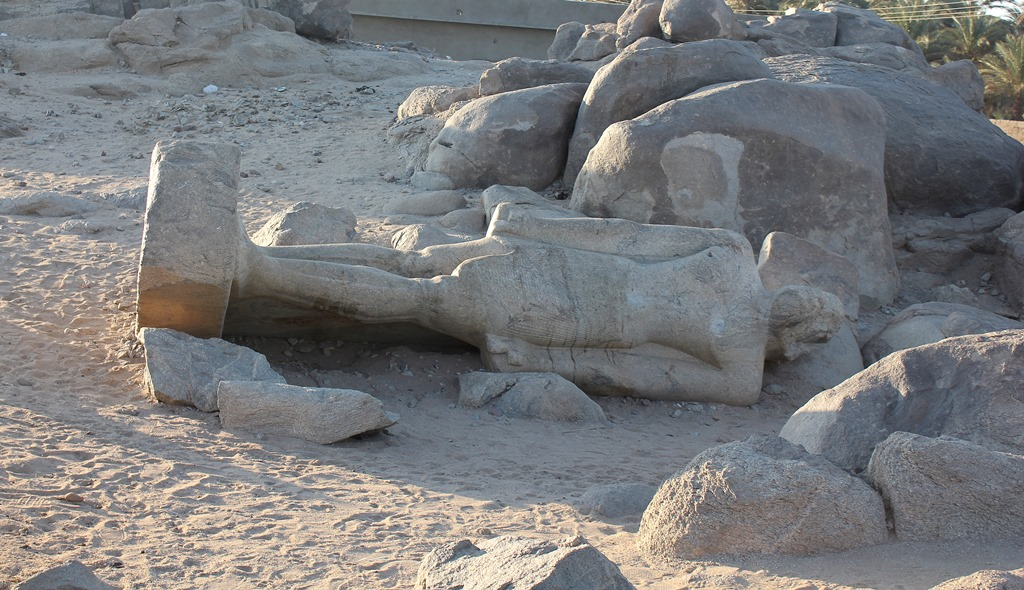
- Unfinished statue of a Kushite king in the quarries near Tombos

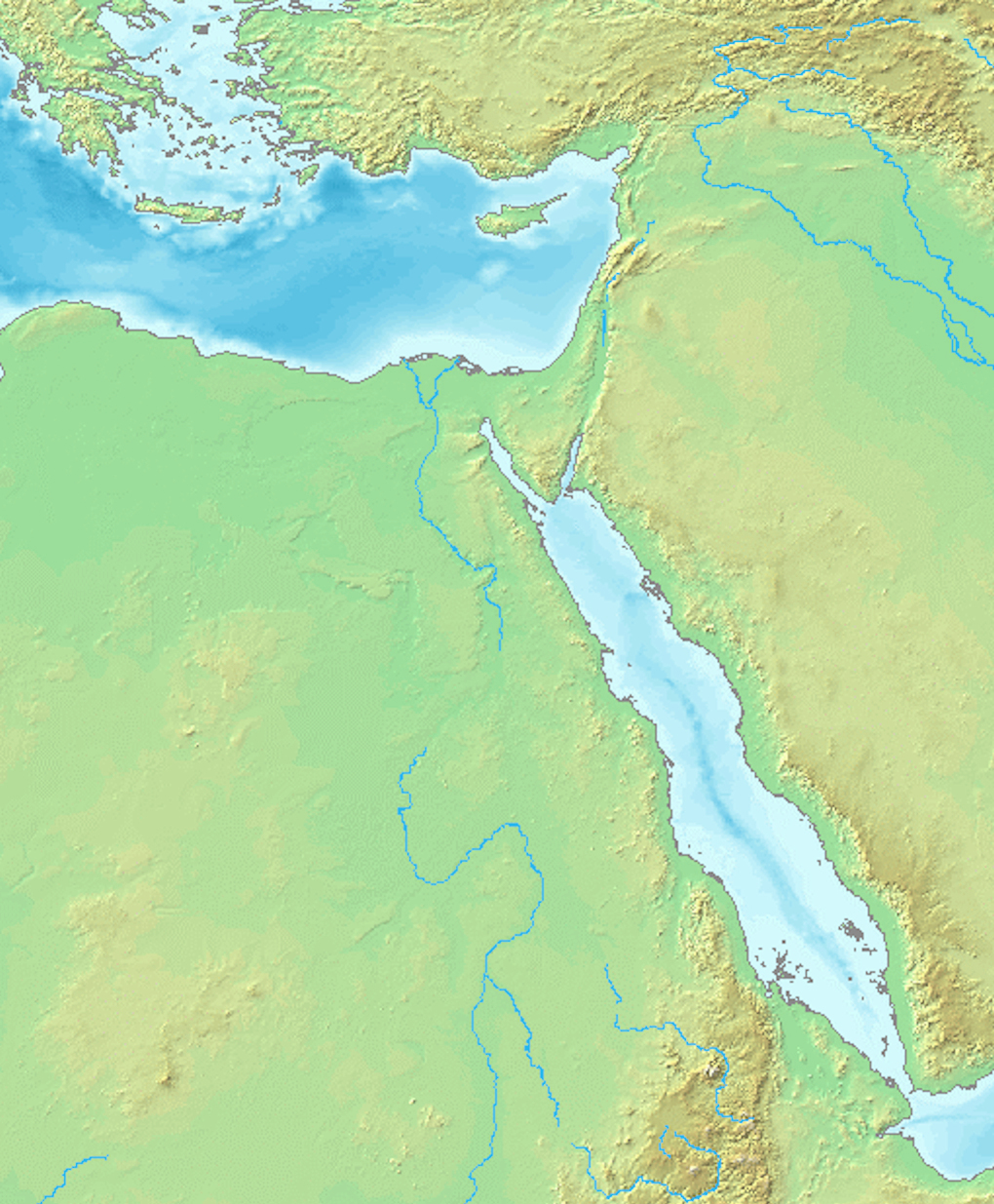
- Location within Northeast Africa Location within Sudan
- Type: Settlement
- Location: Sudan
- Region: Nubia

Site notes
- Condition: In ruins
- Website: tombos.org

Tombos or Tumbus is an archaeological site in northern Sudan, including Tombos island and the nearby riverbank area. Tombos is located at the Third Cataract of the Nile and on the northern margin of the Dongola Reach, not far from Kerma. The occupation of Tombos, revealed by archaeological work, began in mid-18th Dynasty of Egypt and continued through the 25th Dynasty. In the New Kingdom period, a large range of pharaonic and private royal inscriptions from 18th Dynasty and elite tombs in Egyptian style indicates Tombos was an important node of Egyptian colonial control. In the New Kingdom, Tombos witnessed the blending and entanglement of Egyptian and Nubian traditions.

== History of the site excavation ==
A. J. Arkell noted the New Kingdom cemetery and two Mycenaean pottery sherds in his brief visit to Tombos in 1946. A test excavation of the University of Khartoum in 1991 identified the site as a New Kingdom cemetery. The expedition from the University of California, Santa Barbara (UCSB) from 2000 to 2005 showed a more complex cemetery of the New Kingdom period (c. 1400 – 1069 BCE) with continuity into the Napatan period through at least the Kushite, 25th Dynasty of Egypt (c. 1069 – 650 BCE), including various types of tombs in both Egyptian and Nubian style. The UCSB-Purdue joint expedition from 2010 to 2020 revealed more graves of the New Kingdom, as well as the later third intermediate and Napatan periods. Remains of the ancient settlement were found under the modern village in 2013 and a large fortification structure covering the southern end of the village and extending south into a palm grove was identified and defined from 2015–2020.

== Egyptian inscriptions at Tombos ==
A cluster of Egyptian rock inscriptions were found at Tombos, on both the island and the riverbank, including the victory stela of Thutmose I along with a number of short inscriptions commemorating the kings overthrow of Kush. Other inscriptions were carved at the time of Thutmose III, Amenhotep I, and Amenhotep III. The British Museum carried out an epigraphic survey at Tombos, which is a part of larger project of investigating Egyptian inscriptions in northern Sudan.

An inscription praising Thutmose I's defeat of Kush was carved on the rock on the east bank of the Nile, opposite the island of Tombos. This triumphal inscription employed a poetic and non-historical style of royal hymn, remarkable for its heightened use of vocabulary. Scholars noticed the second year of Thutmose I's reign was mentioned for twice, which is an abnormal writing, and Thutmose I's coronation as ruler of the Upper and Lower Egypt was emphasized in this text.

An inscription of an Egyptian viceroy named Inebny or Amenemnekhu was found at the south-east of Tombos island. It was carved on the northern side of a low granite boulder near the river bank. This inscription was dated to the 20th year of Thutmose III. It recorded the achievements of a viceroy to deliver southern goods and tribute to the Pharaoh and his favorable reception by the pharaoh. The viceroy in this text bore the title of "the king's son, overseer of southern foreign lands." However, since the two attestations of his name in the text were both damaged, scholars are debating on the reading of his name and identification. A reading of 'Imn-m-nḫw was suggested for the second example of the name, identifying him as Amenemnekhu, who is known from several rock-inscription in multiple Nubian sites. While the reading 'Inbny (Inebny) is supported by the contemporaneous source. Therefore, the two broken names in this text raised an issue about the number of the viceroys who served in this area under Thutmose III. A possible solution is that Amenemnekhu and Inebny were the alternative names of a single viceroy, active in the Year 20 of Thutmose III.

A brief inscription and a stela attest the presence of the Egyptian viceroy Merymose, who served under Amenhotep III for most of the reign of 38 years. The Inscription is located on the east bank of the Nile, on the northern side of a low-lying boulder of granite gneiss, only several meters from the great stela of Thutmose I. The hieroglyphs of this inscription was carved deeply and skillfully, it is read as "King's son, Merymose." The stela of Merymose was carved on the northern side of a large boulder of granite gneiss, which bears on its western face the victory stela of Thutmose I. It shows the figure of Merymose facing two large cartouches of the Pharaoh Amenhotep III, with his hand raised to worship. Under the cartouches, there are the image of two prisoners, whose arms were bound behind their back. This might be a variant of the motif "union of the two lands." Merymose's position can be identified by the hieroglyphs on the stela Merymose as "the king's son of Kush, overseer of the southern foreign lands, fan-bearer on the right of the king."

== Cemetery ==
During the New Kingdom period, there were two types of tombs at Tombos. The first is characterized by elite pyramid monuments and is situated in the southwestern area of the site; the second are underground chamber tombs of the less wealthy, located to the north. The building and use of these two kinds of graves began about the reign of Thutmose III, probably ended at the late Ramesside period but were reused through the later periods. All the Egyptian burials were characterized by multiple inhumations.

Three tombs of mid-18th Dynasty can be ascribed to named individuals by the inscriptions from funerary cones (clay cones stamped with the name and title of the deceased), which are otherwise almost found exclusively in Thebes. The first is a pyramid monument of Siamun and his wife, Weren (Unit 1 and 4), who is "Scribe Reckoner of the Gold of Kush", this title indicates his was a high-ranking official only second to the viceroy and military commander of the Nubian colony . The structure of Siamun's tomb followed the burial tradition of the Egyptian elite from Thebes, including a large pyramid and a T-shaped chapel with an east-west alignment set into it. A radiocarbon date from bone and the pottery associated with the tomb's enclosure points suggest a range of date between the reign of Thutmose IV and Amenhotep III. The second is also a pyramid tomb belonging to Tiy. His funerary cone is not as elaborate as Siamun's, it is a simple stamp only has Tiy's hieroglyphic name on it, indicating that it was an adaptation but not the conventional form of Theban practice. A poorly preserved but very high-quality coffin with inlaid faience was found in Tiy's tomb, as well as a sophisticated carved funerary figurine (ushabti) with his name and title on it. The third is a complex with chapels around the shaft of the tomb, owned by Horemhet, but no trace of the pyramid remains, and it also contains the funerary cones from Theban tradition, but in a simplified form. The funerary cones and overwhelmingly Egyptian structure of these elite tombs suggests the colonial control from Thebes, which integrated Tombos into a broader framework of royal political economy of the Egyptian empire.

Underground chamber and pit tombs were designed for multiple inhumation, and belonged to middle-class individuals, probably the lower-ranking bureaucrats and other skilled workers. The burial objects, such as coffins, amulets, and statuary are consistent with Egyptian funerary beliefs, and Nubian personal adornment like ivory bracelets and earrings were also found. The pottery is mostly in Egyptian style, with a few Nubian ceramics. Most burials displayed an Egyptian extended body position, however, within these Egyptian middle-class tombs four females were buried using Nubian flexed position (with the head oriented to the east, and the right side facing north), interestingly, one female had three amulets of Bes (a popular Egyptian household god) around her neck. The existence of the Nubian Tumulus tomb in Tombos began in the late New Kingdom period and continued into the Napatan period. Contrasted with the Egyptian tombs, communal burials are rare, but all the individuals were put in the Egyptian extended body position, sometimes were mummified and inside coffins, while on the Nubian-style funerary beds. A burial of a horse was found in a reused shaft of a pyramid tomb originally constructed in the New Kingdom period, while the calibrated radiocarbon results placed the horse in the early Third Intermediate Period. A scarab with the image of the Egyptian god Ptah and the remains of an iron cheekpiece (one of the earliest iron pieces found in Nubia) were found to be associated with the horse. Osteological analysis shows evidence for the use of chariot saddle harness, as well as suggests that the horse engaged in regular and somewhat strenuous physical activity. Since the equid burials in the New Kingdom period was rare and the 25th Napatan Dynasty was characterized by the equid veneration, scholars argue that this horse burial is related to the formation of Napatan ideology.

Research by Buzon found that

Egyptian males and females from Abydos, Sheikh Ali, Memphis, and Qurna are classified correctly (greater than 75% Egyptian) much more frequently than Nubians from C-Group and Kerma sites (~40-50% Nubian). This is likely due to the individuals of the Egyptian group having a more distinctive, consistent cranial shape. The Nubians, in contrast, are predicted to be more evenly divided between the Egyptian and Nubian groups, suggesting that the cranial shape of the individuals in this group is less consistent. The 'Other' group, which included the Pharaonic and Shellal sites, is mixed, but includes more individuals with Egyptian' cranial morphology. The Tombos sample is divided more evenly between the two categories.

Studies of individuals buried in the Tombos mud-brick pyramids have determined that many were low-level workers, challenging the long held view that monumental tombs were reserved for the elite or very wealthy.

=== Bioarchaeological Insights into Health and Colonial Impact ===
The traumatic injuries observed at Tombos provide insights into the effects of Egyptian colonial policies on local Nubian populations. During the New Kingdom period, evidence suggests a decrease in violent injuries compared to earlier eras, such as the Middle Kingdom. This decline in violence is evidence toward a shift in Egyptian colonial strategy from military dominance to a more diplomatic and integrative approach. In the Middle Kingdom, Egypt launched aggressive campaigns against the Nubian community at Kerma, intensifying conflicts and leading to high rates of skeletal injuries. However, by the New Kingdom, Egypt had largely incorporated Nubia into its empire. Instead of relying only on military force, they included and incentivized Nubian elites in local governance and trade administration. This directly benefited the Nubian elites which helped the Egyptians establish control with minimal military intervention.

At Tombos, skeletal analysis shows fewer cases of cranial trauma and defensive injuries, such as "parry" fractures, which are usually associated with interpersonal violence. This is different from the higher injury rates observed at Kerma, where violent interactions were more common. The decrease in traumatic injuries at Tombos indicates a shift toward cooperation and integration, as Egypt's colonial strategy in the New Kingdom period involved collaboration with local Nubian elites. This more cooperative approach contributed to a more peaceful environment at Tombos, demonstrating that partnerships with the local population were effective in supporting Egypt's economic and political goals. Diplomacy and cooperation with the colonized Nubians was a successful way to achieve control with minimal conflict with the people living at Tombos.

The health of Nubians at the Tombos site during the New Kingdom period reveals the effects of Egyptian colonialism on the non-elite Nubian population. Analysis of skeletal remains at Tombos shows evidence of nutritional and disease stress, which was more severe in children than adults. Conditions like cribra orbitalia, which is linked to anemia, was more common in children. Active lesions were present in all affected children, which can indicate a high rate of childhood illness and mortality. In contrast, adults had lower rates of this condition, and their lesions were mostly remodeled, indicating survival after earlier exposure to stressors. The Tombos population's closeness to Egyptian resources and trade networks helped to provide nutritional benefits, like higher access to cattle and other livestock. This may have supported better health at Tombos than at other Nubian sites, like Kerma, where access was limited. However, increased interaction with outsiders may have increased exposure to infectious diseases, such as trepanemotosis and tuberculosis, which may explain declined health in the population.

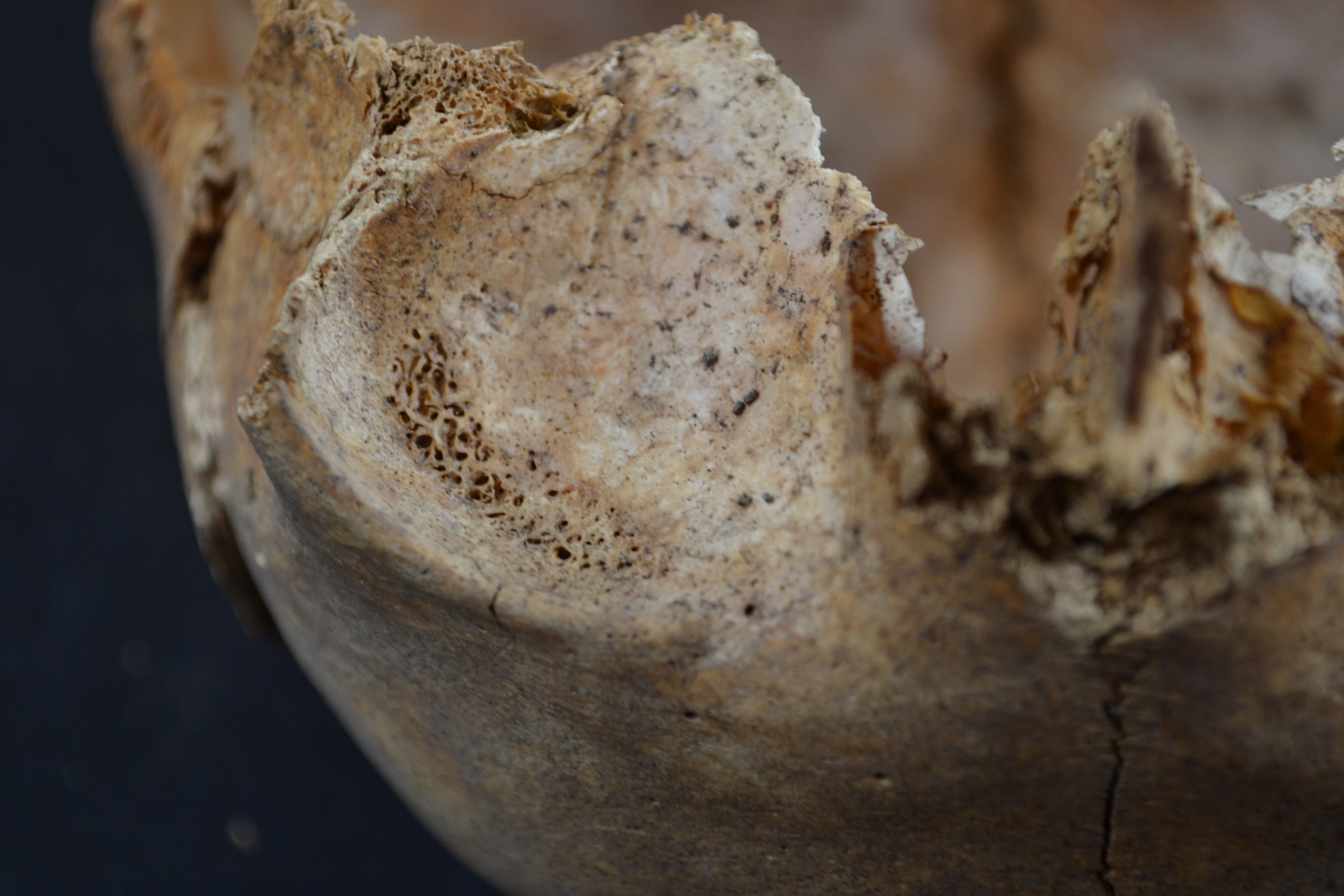
Example of Cribra Orbitalia in a young child; not from Tombos

Shorter femur lengths in Tombos males, compared to those from Kerma, further demonstrated that stress during childhood affected the growth of this population. Even though the people of Tombos were part of the Egyptian colonial system, their health outcomes show that having those ties did not help with the environmental and biological challenges they faced. The health data from Tombos gives us a glimpse into the physical toll of being integrated into the colonial system and the ongoing struggles that the population dealt with.

== Fortification ==
From 2015 to 2017, the UCSB-Purdue joint expedition revealed a ditch cut into the alluvium and lined with mud brick walls. This trench itself was cut around four meters wide and was reduced to about three meters with the walls. The floor and walls were roughly plastered. It made right angle turn at the eastern end, and ran westwards to the riverbank, a distance of 215m from the north-eastern corner of this structure. The 2013 excavation at the southern edge of the Tombos village revealed the foundations of a masonry structure. Archaeologists found the negative impression of beams and roofing, some fragments showing a finished floor above the ceiling, and a sandstone column base hinting at the existence of a clerestory or portico. Thus they proposed this structure might have served as elite residences or perhaps administrative or religious buildings. Most pottery associated with these structures was dated to the late 18th Dynasty, but maintained continuity through the third intermediate period and the 25th Dynasty and Nubian influence can be seen through the presence of the mat-impressed cooking wares.

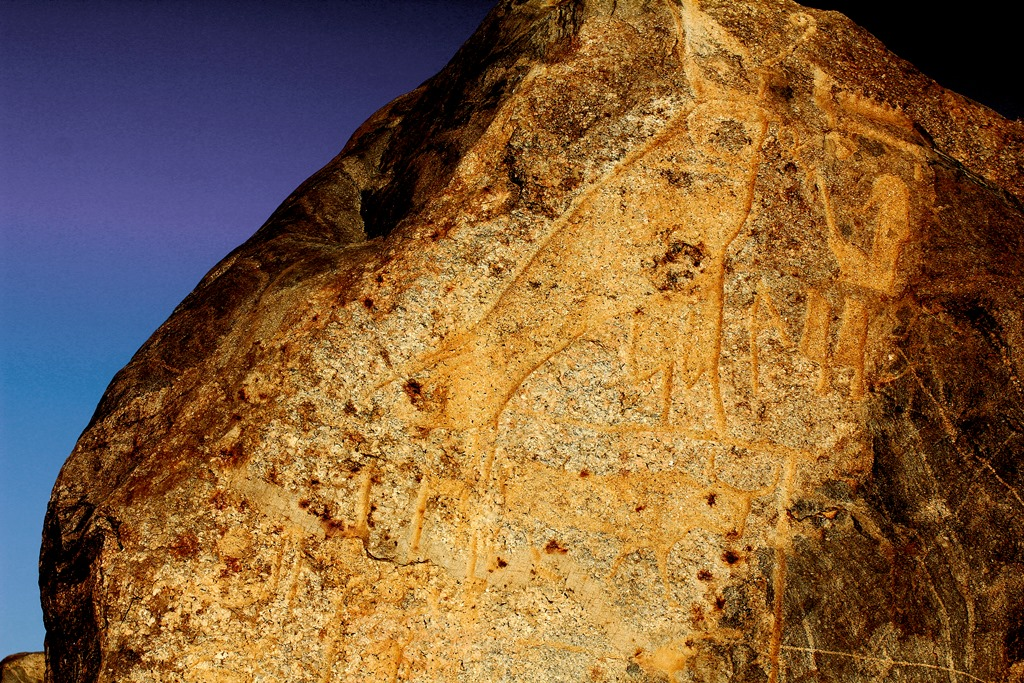
Inscription with the Horus name of Thutmose I

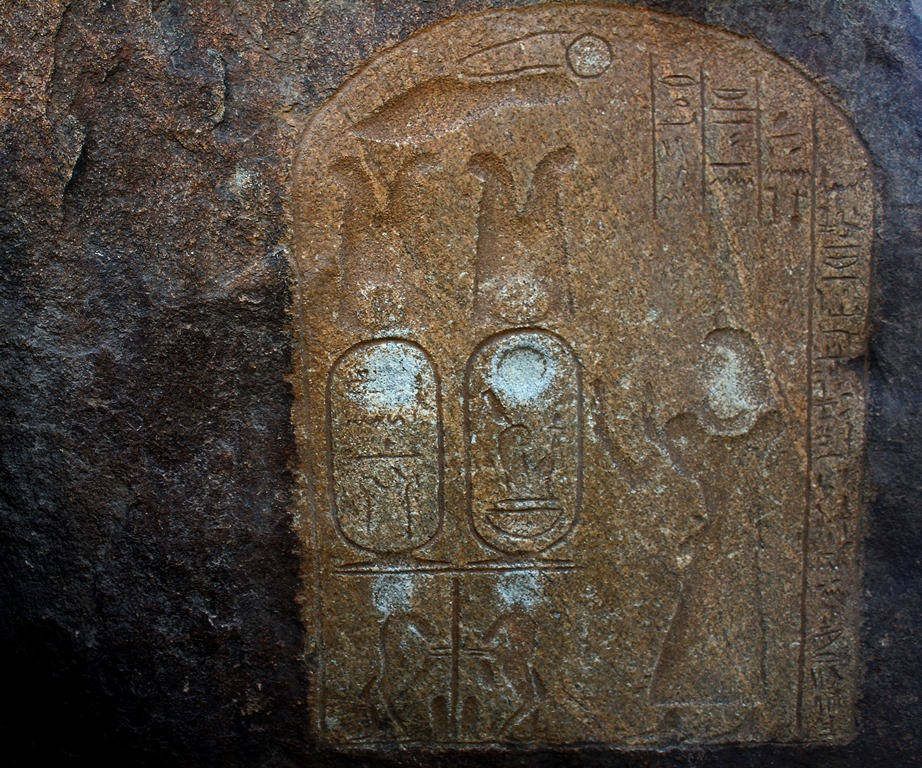
Stela of Merymose adoring the cartouche of Amenhotep III

== Bibliogrophy ==
- Smith, Stuart Tyson (2003). Wretched Kush: Ethnic Identities and Boundaries in Egypt's Nubian Empire. London: Routledge.
- Buzon, Michele R. (2006). "The Relationship between Ethnic and Biological Identity in New Kingdom Nubia: A Case Study from Tombos". Current Anthropology, 47, pp. 683–695.
- Buzon, Michele R. (2006). "Health of the Non-Elites at Tombos: Nutritional and Disease Stress in New Kingdom Nubia". American Journal of Physical Anthropology, 130, pp. 26–37.
- Buzon, Michele R., and Rebecca Richman (2007). "Traumatic Injuries and Imperialism: The Effects of Egyptian Colonial Strategies at Tombos in Upper Nubia". American Journal of Physical Anthropology, 133(2), pp. 783–791.
- Buzon, Michele R., Antonio Simonetti, and Robert A. Creaser (2007). "Migration in the Nile Valley during the New Kingdom Period: A Preliminary Strontium Isotope Study". Journal of Archaeological Science, 34, pp. 1391–1401.
- Smith, Stuart Tyson (2007). "Death at Tombos: Pyramids, Iron and the Rise of the Napatan Dynasty". Sudan & Nubia, 11, pp. 2–14.
- Buzon, Michele R. (2014). "Tombos during the Napatan Period (c. 750–660 BC): Exploring the Consequences of Sociopolitical Transitions in Ancient Nubia". International Journal of Paleopathology, 7, pp. 1–7.
- Buzon, Michele R., and Stuart Tyson Smith (2023). "Tumuli at Tombos: Innovation, Tradition, and Variability in Nubia during the Early Napatan Period". African Archaeological Review, 40, pp. 621–642.
- Buzon, Michele R., Katie M. Whitmore, and Stuart Tyson Smith (2025). "Pre-Adult Burials at Tombos: An Investigation of Social Age and Health Over the Life Course in the Ancient Nile Valley". African Archaeological Review, 42, pp. 495–517.
- "Daily Life in a New Kingdom Fortress Town in Nubia: A Reexamination of Physical Activity at Tombos" (2025). Journal of Anthropological Archaeology, 78, article 101668.

== See also ==
- Tombos Stela
