= TT383 =

Theban tomb

Theban tomb TT383
- Burial site of Merymose
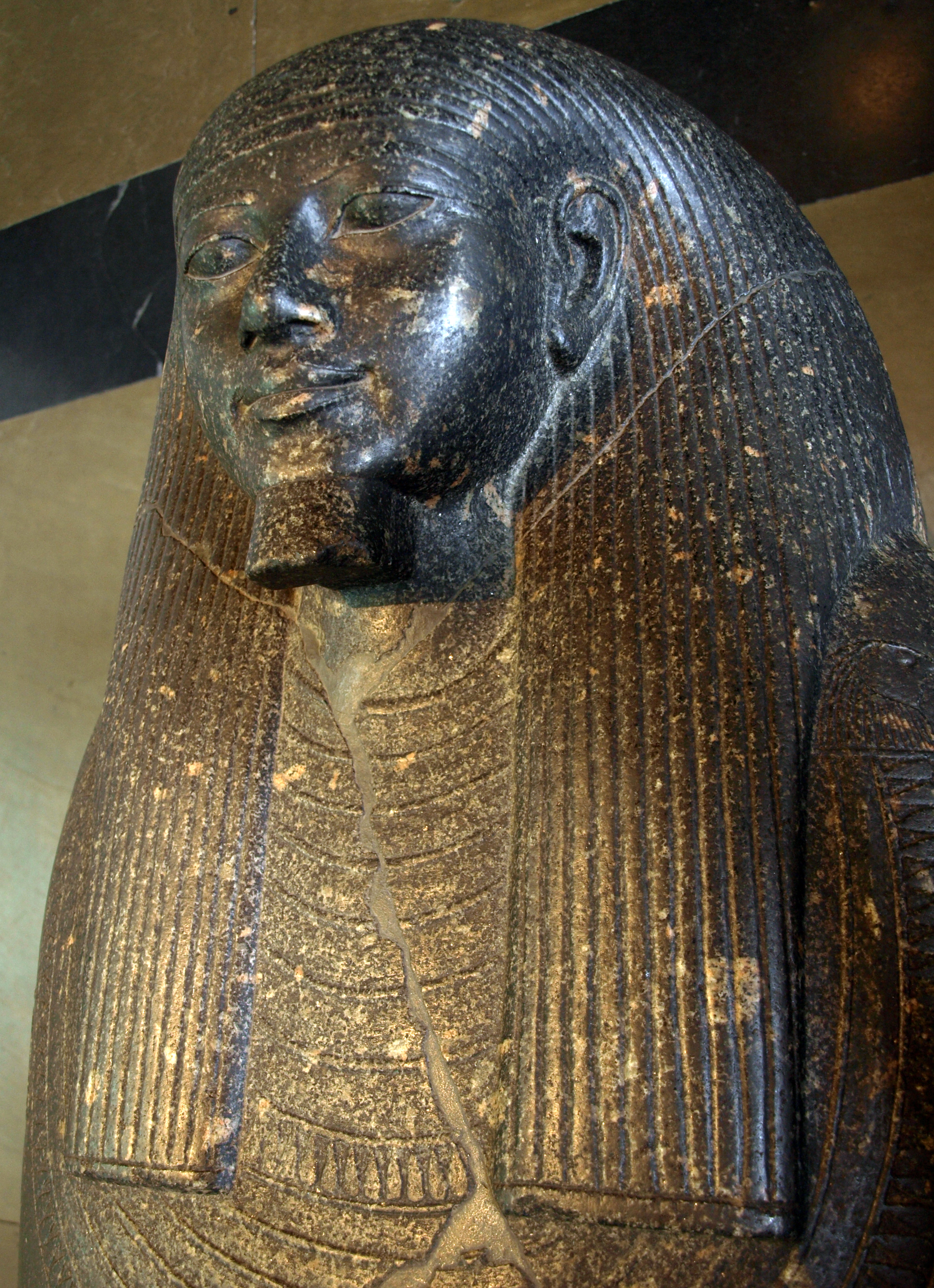
- Sarcophagus of Merymose, from TT383

- Location within Egypt
- Location: Qurnet Murai, Theban Necropolis
- ← Previous; TT382 Next → TT384

mr r i i ms s
Merymose
in hieroglyphs
Era: New Kingdom
(1550–1069 BC)

The Theban Tomb TT383 is located in Qurnet Murai, part of the Theban Necropolis, on the west bank of the Nile, opposite to Luxor. It is the burial place of the ancient Egyptian Viceroy of Kush named Merymose, who lived during the 18th Dynasty and served under Amenhotep III.

Merymose's titles included: King's son (of Kush), Overseer of the Southern Lands, Overseer of the Gold Lands of Amun, King's Scribe, Overseer of the King's Scribes, Overseer of the Treasury, and Steward of the Peasantry (?).

== Tomb ==
Merymose was buried in TT383 in three anthropoid sarcophagi. The stone for these sarcophagi comes from either Upper Egypt or from Kush. The fragments are spread over several different locations: the British Museum, the Boston Museum of Fine Arts and Vassar College.

Other finds from the tomb include a stela showing Merymose adoring Osiris and a stela showing Merymose and his scribe of documents named Huy. A stela now in the Cairo Museum (Cairo Mus. 34139) depicting Merymose before Osiris and Hathor is most likely from this tomb as well.

== See also ==
- List of Theban tombs
