= Tombos Stela =

Ancient Egyptian stela

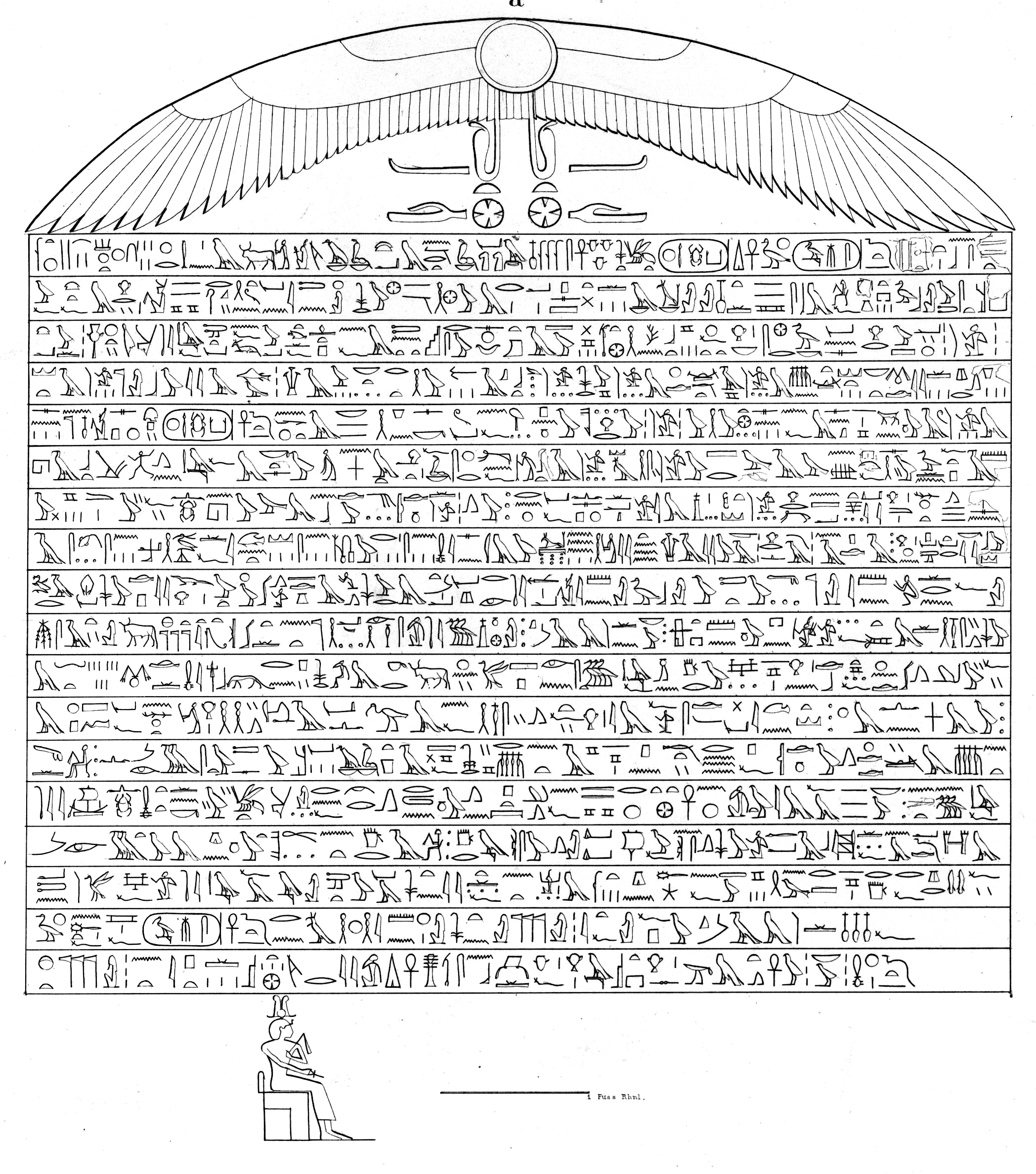
- Drawing of the Tombos Stela By Karl Richard Lepsius
- Created: c. 1514 BC
- Discovered: 1829; Northern State, Sudan

The Tombos Stela is an ancient Egyptian rock inscription found in the area of Tombos (Nubia), dated to Year 2 of Pharaoh Thutmose I. It attests to his military campaign into Nubia around the area of the 3rd cataract of the Nile. It was discovered around 1829, on a large boulder in Tombos, Nubia on the east bank of the Nile. Thutmose is known to have expanded Egypt's borders throughout his reign, not only in Nubia, but also by campaigns in the Syria-Palestine area. During the Middle Kingdom, pharaohs such as Mentuhotep II had already expanded into Nubia. However, scholars argue that the Tombos stela is evidence of farther expansion by Thutmose into Nubia than previous kings.

== Background ==
The Nile flows generally north through Africa, passing through Nubia into Egypt and eventually empties into the Mediterranean Sea. Along stretches of the river south of Egypt there are what are termed "cataracts". Cataracts are areas in the river where there are patches of rock, making the river dangerous and unnavigable by boat. These cataracts served as general boundary points for the Egyptian Empire, and often settlements and forts were constructed around these natural boundaries. Egypt's natural boundary was in the area of the first cataract, just south of Aswan. The Nubian empire was Egypt's historical enemy, with its territory spread throughout the areas of the second cataract, down into the area of Kush, and around the 4th and 5th cataracts around the area of Khartoum (Modern day Sudan). Around the time of the Second Intermediate Period Nubia seized land past its border with Egypt at the 1st cataract, almost wiping out Egypt's empire. Egyptian Pharaoh Ahmose crushed the Nubian expansion and re-established Egyptian dominance by reunifying the empire while turning back the Nubians to the south.

== The text ==
Two of the more prominently-used English versions of the text are those translated by scholars James Henry Breasted and Hans Goedicke. This article will use Goedicke's translation. It reads as follows:

Year 2, 2d month of day 15 under the Majesty of Horus “victorious bull” law loving; Nbty: who appears with Nsrt, great of strength; gold-horus: beautiful of years, who enlivens the hearts, King, given life eternally, Son-of-Re Thutmosis. In the 2d year that he was introduced: His appearance as Chief of the two lands in order to rule what the sun disc has encircled, South and also North, namely the parts of Horus and seth- uniting the Two lands, as he sits on the thrones of Geb; Elevating the appearances of the Shmty, Indeed as soon as his Majesty took possession of his heritage, he ascended the dais of horus, concerning the widening of the borders of Thebes and the measured plots of the West Side concerning the plain and hill dwellers, even abominations-of god and restrained of locks work for her. (Foreign) southerners are going north, (foreign) northerners are going south; all foreigners are united their goods for the first occasion of the “Good-god” hpr-ke-re [Thutmosis I], living eternally. Victorious is Horus, the Lord of the two lands; After he tied the moving campaign to the landing posts, the superiors and their villages belong to him in veneration, and the skin-garbed are (either) dancing for His Majesty or are in respect for his uraeus: After he overthrew the chief of the Nubians, the despoiled Nubian belongs to his grip. After he had gathered the border markers of both sides, no escape existed among the evil-of-character; those who had come to support him---not one thereof remained. As the Nubian have fallen to terror and are laid aside throughout their lands, their stench, it floods their wadis, their blood is like a rainstorm. The carrion-eating birds over it are numerous, those birds were picking and carrying the flesh to another (desert) place. The one who keeps himself safe- the crocodile is a fugitive; the one who tries to hide himself from the successful Horus is one who is under what the Unique One will do. The son of Amun, seed of the god, whose name is hidden, offspring of the bull of the gods’ Ennead, excellent image of god’s limbs. Who does what the souls of Heliopolis will praise. Who fashions for the lords of the hwt. A stronghold for his entire army. Who approaches among the assembled Nine-bows like a young panther in a resting cattleherd, after the might of His Majesty has blinded it. Who reached the limits of the earth on its foundations, who stepped on its limits in his victorious strength while seeking to fight: nor can he find one who can approach facing him. Who opened wadis, which predecessors were ignorant of and any bearers of the Nbty have ever seen: his southern limit at the beginning of this earth and the northern one to that water which is circumvented. Who traveled continuously downstream from the south journey; such as has not happened to the other bitis, as his name has extended to the circuit of heaven. After it reached what is known of the Two lands, one swears by him in all lands for the greatness of his majesty’s might. Nor has one ever seen it in the annals of predecessors since the Followers-of-Horus: one who always gives his breath to the one who follows him and his great offering to the one who adhered to his path. As soon as his majesty is Horus who takes possession of his kingship of million of years, the islands of the sn-wr serve him as the earth to its limits under his sandals. The son-of-re his beloved Thutmosis, living forever and ever. Amun-Re, the king of the gods-it is his father, who created his beauty. The desired one of the Ennead of gods of Karnak, given life, duration, luck, and health: he be joyous on the Horus-throne, while leading all living ones like Re eternally.

== Historical textual analysis ==
The text is written in poetic language, and the variations among the translations can lead to different interpretations. In the search for corresponding evidence to support the validity of the Tombos stela, only Egyptian accounts are available.

This inscription was a royal one glorifying the king and his exploits, not necessarily an inscription that is historical. This is seen in language that glorifies the king: "The son-of-re his beloved Thutmosis living forever and ever." The author of the inscription must have had knowledge of Thutmosis' campaign. The text also reveals animosity towards Nubians. This is shown in the section:

After he overthrew the chief of the Nubians, the despoiled Nubian belongs to his grip. After he had gathered the border markers of both sides, no escape existed among the evil-of-character; those who had come to support him---not one thereof remained. As the Nubian have fallen to terror and are laid aside throughout their lands, their stench, it floods their wadis.

From these passages it is shown that this stela was meant to glorify the king and his achievements. It was meant to be on display so people could see it and admire it. The language was meant to show Egyptian superiority over the enemies of Egypt. The king was obligated to uphold the order of maat, which is known as “truth, order, and justice” and to destroy the enemies of Egypt. Whoever wrote the inscription may have been justifying the war in Nubia by describing Nubians as “evil-ones”. In the text there is also a justification of the actions taken by Thutmosis I by the God Horus. Despite these interpretation of texts, there are different historical scholars who offer their interpretations on the Tombos stela.

== Opinions of scholars ==
One of the more well-supported theories is argued by Louise Bradbury, who has posited that the Tombos stela provides evidence that Thutmose I expanded Egypt's control beyond the 3rd cataract of the Nile river, into an area south of Tombos called Kurgus, located just above the 4th cataract. Her first piece of evidence is an inscription found at a site called Hagar el-Merwa, around the 4th cataract in the area of Kurgus in Nubian territory. She notes that Hagar el-Merwa and the inscription found there can offer proof of an expansion by Thutmosis I into the area around the fourth cataract. Bradbury argues that the Tombos stela was carved after Thutmose's return trip north from Hagar el-Merwa. Previously scholars argued that the Tombos stela described Thutmose's expansion into the area of Nubia, as well as his expansion near the Euphrates (around modern day Iraq). This is because the river described in the stela was previously believed to be the Euphrates.

Bradbury's theory argues that the Tombos stela was a northern boundary marker for Thutmose's expansion into Nubia and a description of his middle-east campaign. She argues that his Egyptian empire in Nubia stretched from the marker at Tombos, around the 3rd cataract, south towards Hagar el-Merwa around the 4th cataract. She does not argue that Thutmose's encompassed Nubia, and the middle east at once.

Bradbury argues that the “inverted/circumvented water” phrase in the Tombos stela is actually a description of the Nile river in its natural change of direction. Around the area of the 4th cataract, the flow of the Nile shifts from northward to southward. This may have created some confusion for Egyptians traveling north from Nubia. Bradbury uses the source of Ahmose, son of Ebana to corroborate this evidence that the reference to “bad water, or inverted water” means the area around the 4th cataract of the Nile. Ahmose son of Ebana, traveled with Thutmosis during his campaigns in Nubia. He writes of “bad water” during their journey into Nubia. Bradbury argues that Egyptians chose to write about the bad water because while they were sailing north along the Nile around the area of the 4th cataract, the river changed course and they found themselves sailing south. This sudden change in direction may have confused Egyptians who had never traveled in the area before.

Another scholar, Julia Budka, notes that there are many contemporary rock inscriptions found around the Tombos Stela. She maintains that these create a larger corpus of evidence on the story of the stela itself. These minor stela go in order from the large stela in the south and move north. They read as follows; “Horus Victorious Bull, Beloved of Maat, the good god [akh] hprkere [Thutmosis I] given life, who has stroken Kush [Nubia]... “Thuthmosis, who appeared like Re [A God] given life; the Lord of Nubia…Victorious Bull…The king of Upper and Lower Egypt, the Lord of the Two lands, ahprkera [Thutmosis I] given life, the victorious ruler, who destroyed the Nubians.” Budka notes that these rock inscriptions all date to the 18th dynasty. These inscriptions provide evidence that Thutmosis had some sort of military expansion into Nubia, and support the conclusions about the Tombos stela. Budka agrees with scholar Louise Bradbury and her theory that the Tombos stela is evidence of an Egyptian expansion into Nubia during the reign of Thutmosis. Other scholars see religious significance in the Tombos stela and deny the theory that the “inverted water” text is evidence for travel around the 4th cataract in Nubia.

There are scholars who disagree with the theory of Nubian expansion past Tombos, and offer evidence against the theory proposed by Bradbury.

== Bibliography ==
- Berg, David A. (1987). "Early 18th Dynasty expansion into Nubia". Journal of the Society for the Study of Egyptian Antiquities. 17 (1): 1–14.
- Breasted, James H. (1906). Ancient Records of Egypt. Chicago: University of Chicago press. pp. 27-31.
- Bradbury, Louise (1985). "The Tombos inscription: a new interpretation". Serapis. 8: 1–20.
- Budka, Julia (2005). "The Third Cataract: its historical importance according to royal and private rock inscriptions at Tombos". In Amenta, Alessia; Luiselli, Maria M.; Novella, Maria (eds.). L'acqua nell'antico Egitto: vita, rigenerazione, incantesimo, medicamento; proceedings of the first International conference for young Egyptologists. Italy, Chianciano Terme, October 15–18, 2003. Roma: "L'Erma" di Bretschneider. pp. 107–115.
- Goedicke, Hans (1996). "The Thutmosis I Inscription Near Tomâs". Journal of Near Eastern Studies. 55 (3): 161–176. doi:10.1086/373823. JSTOR 545876. S2CID 162393518.
- Lichtheim, Miriam (2006). Ancient Egyptian Literature, vol. 2. University of California Press. p. 12.
- Prudhoe MSS, 1829,
- Porter, B.; Moss, R. Topographical Bibliography of Ancient Egyptian Hieroglyphic Texts, Statues, Reliefs, and Paintings, Part VII. Oxford: Griffith Institute, University of Oxford. pp. 174–175.
- Smith, Stuart (2003). Wretched Kush. London: Routledge Taylor & Francis group. p. 12.
- Anthony, Spalinger (1995). "The Calendrical Importance of the Tombos Stela". Studien zur Altägyptischen Kultur. 22: 271–81.
- Teeter, Emily (2001). "Maat". The Oxford Encyclopedia of Ancient Egypt. Roma: Oxford University Press. pp. 107–115. doi:10.1093/acref/9780195102345.001.0001. ISBN 978-0-19-510234-5.
