= TT382 =

Theban tomb

Theban tomb TT382
- Burial site of Usermontu
- Location within Egypt
- Location: Qurnet Murai, Theban Necropolis
- ← Previous; TT381 Next → TT383

F12 s Y5 N35 V13
Usermontu
in hieroglyphs
Era: New Kingdom
(1550–1069 BC)

Theban Tomb TT382 is located in Qurnet Murai, part of the Theban Necropolis, on the west bank of the Nile, opposite to Luxor. It is the burial place of the ancient Egyptian High Priest of Montu named Usermontu, who lived during the 19th Dynasty and served under Ramesses II.

Usermontu's titles included: High Priest of Montu, High Steward, Superintendent of Cattle, Superintendent of the Granary, and Treasury Chief. Usermontu's wife Tiy was Chief of the Harim of Montu.

== Tomb ==
The walls of the passage to the chapel are decorated with scenes from the Book of Gates. Usermontu and his wife Tiy make offerings to gods in shrines. The burial chamber contained a black granite sarcophagus. The sarcophagus contained a pink granite coffin, which is now in the collection of the Metropolitan Museum (Accession Number:17.190.2042a–c).

== See also ==
- List of Theban tombs
