= Sudan Archaeological Research Society =

Archaeological research society in Sudan

The Sudan Archaeological Research Society is a registered British charity (number 1005966) based in London, UK. It was founded in 1991 to study the history and culture of Sudan and expanded its remit in 2011 to include the newly independent South Sudan. The society has surveyed and excavated numerous archaeological sites across Sudan, and disseminates its research through publications and events.

== History ==
The Sudan Archaeological Research Society (SARS) was established in November 1991 by a group of British archaeologists in collaboration with the National Corporation for Antiquities and Museums, Sudan, and the British Council in Sudan. The society was set up with the aim of advancing knowledge and interest in the cultural heritage of Sudan. Its constitution states that its primary objective is “to promote and carry out … research, surveys, investigations and excavations… and publish and disseminate the useful results of such work”. It has carried out numerous surveys and excavation projects at major sites across Sudan, including Gabati, Kawa and Kanisah Kurgus, and remains active in fieldwork and other programmes.

The society has, with the permission of the National Corporation for Antiquities and Museums Sudan, donated select artefacts from excavations such as Kawa and Gabati to the British Museum. Rock art, ceramics, and human remains from the Fourth Cataract were recovered during the Merowe Dam Archaeological Salvage Project, some of which are on display in the British Museum, Gallery 65. The majority of the material is housed in Sudan with the National Corporation for Antiquities and Museums in the Sudan National Museum, Khartoum, the Merowe Museum, Al-Multaga and the Jebel Barkal Museum, Kareima.

== Today ==
The society is based in offices in the Department of Egypt and Sudan in the British Museum London, and holds an annual programme of public events, including the annual W.Y. Adams Colloquium: Sudan – Past & Present, and the Kirwan Memorial Lecture, delivered by a leading researcher. The society also publishes an annual journal, Sudan & Nubia, as well as a related monograph series.

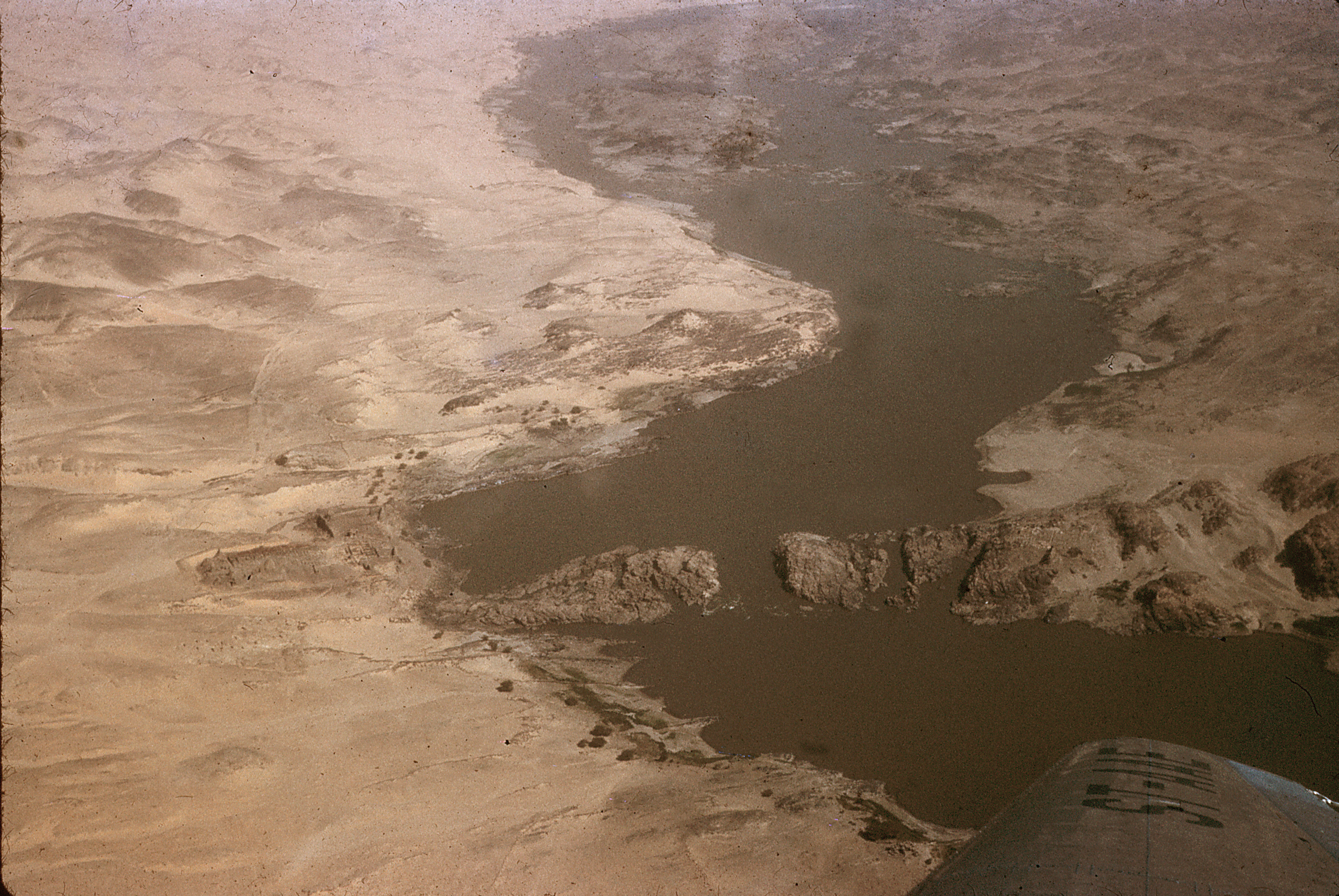
SARS ADAMS Archive: ADA S002.04 – Semna Cataract - Semna fortress and temple, from the south

=== The W. Y. Adams Library ===
The main SARS library is housed in the society's office in the Department of Egypt and Sudan at the British Museum in London. It also maintains a branch library within the office of the Section Française de la Direction des Antiquités du Soudan in the premises of the National Corporation for Antiquities and Museums (Sudan) in Khartoum. Both libraries are open for consultation by appointment. The core of the library is formed of books and offprints once belonging to the society's first president, Sir Laurence Kirwan, and to the late honorary president, Professor William Y. Adams. Amongst its most useful assets is a full run of Kush, the journal of the Sudan Antiquities Service, many volumes of Sudan Notes and Records and important publications on Sudanese history and archaeology.

=== The SARS Archive ===
The SARS archive contains the original records from the society's survey and excavation projects, as well as a large number of photographs, negatives and transparencies from numerous scholars and travelers between the 1930s and 1980s. Many record sites long since destroyed, particularly those in the region of Lake Nubia/Nasser and at Suakin. It also holds a large number of plans and elevations, maps, aerial photographs and satellite images.

=== Fieldwork projects ===
Begrawiya-Atbara Survey: 1993–1994. Undertaken in early 1993, the survey focused on the new road from the pyramid area at Begrawiya (ancient Meroe) up to Atbara, a distance of 90 km. This work was followed by a second season of limited excavation at several sites, including the cemetery at Gabati.

Gabati: 1994–1995. During the survey along the course of the new road from Begrawiya to Atbara, a large cemetery was discovered at Gabati set directly on the line of the highway. At this late stage in the planning it was not possible to re-route the road around the site. In response to this threat, the society was able to undertake a single season of rescue excavation before the site disappeared forever. Within the three-month project, over the winter of 1994–1995, the team excavated a total of 104 graves dating to the later Kushite, Post-Meroitic and Medieval periods.

Northern Dongola Reach Survey: 1993–1997. The Northern Dongola Reach Survey (NDRS) worked across a concession on the east bank of the Nile for 80 km along the river and to the edge of the desert plateau, a maximum of 18 km from the river. Over 450 sites were found together with evidence for Nile palaeochannels, the banks of which had been densely settled during the Kerma period (c. 2500-1500 BC). The demise of these palaeochannels resulted in a dramatic fall in the population of the region by the 1st millennium BC. Many cemeteries were located here. Particularly numerous were those of the Neolithic period. Kerma tumuli were well preserved in places and covered in white quartzite pebbles and fragments of black stone. Medieval box graves were located close to the river as were the Islamic period tombs (qubba)of holy men.

Bayuda Desert Survey: 1999. The Challenge Road was part of a project, now completed, to provide an all-weather tarmac road linking Khartoum with the major centres in the north of Sudan, Kareima and Dongola. It was laid out across the Bayuda Desert in a direct line between the confluence of the White and Blue Niles and the most southerly part of the Debba Bend, re-joining the Nile at Gabolab. Between 95 km and 210 km from Omdurman, it follows the course of the Wadi Muqaddam. During the Survey, 192 archaeological sites were discovered, with many concentrated along the Wadi Muqaddam. The occupation spans from the Palaeolithic into the medieval period. From the Neolithic, settled communities were present and evidence of land and freshwater molluscs along with fish bones indicates the presence of standing water in the wadi.

Jebel Umm Rowag: 2001. The mountain (jebel), set within the sharp bend of the Nile between Dal and Amara, dominates its surroundings. Its conical form and isolated situation make it a prominent landmark. Attaining a maximum height of 454 m, it towers above the countryside. The lower slopes are steep while the summit is narrow and covered with rock outcrops and massive boulders. Rock drawings of birds, the head of a king, ankhs and a geometric design occupy the very top of the mountain and were carved on both vertical and horizontal slabs. Hut circles and deposits of pottery were found close to the summit and on the upper slopes.

Amri to Kirbekan Survey: 1999–2007. This was the society's contribution to the Merowe Dam Archaeological Salvage Project. The society's mission to the Fourth Cataract was one of the first to heed the call first made by the National Corporation for Antiquities and Museums Sudan in 1993 to work in the region threatened by the construction of what was then known as the Hamdab Dam. In October 1999, SARS work began in a concession 40 km in length along the left bank of the Nile and on all the adjacent islands between Amri and Kirbekan - that is between the fortresses of Suweigi at Dar el-Arab upstream to Jebel Musa. Fieldwork included excavation and survey of a number of sites from across several thousand years of Sudanese history, as well as ethnographic and environmental study, in addition to the identification of numerous examples of rock art. After several seasons the fieldwork came to a close in November 2007. The dam was completed in 2008, and by the end of that year the reservoir was substantially full. A detailed report on the first season's work was published, and further results were made available in draft form ahead of final publication.

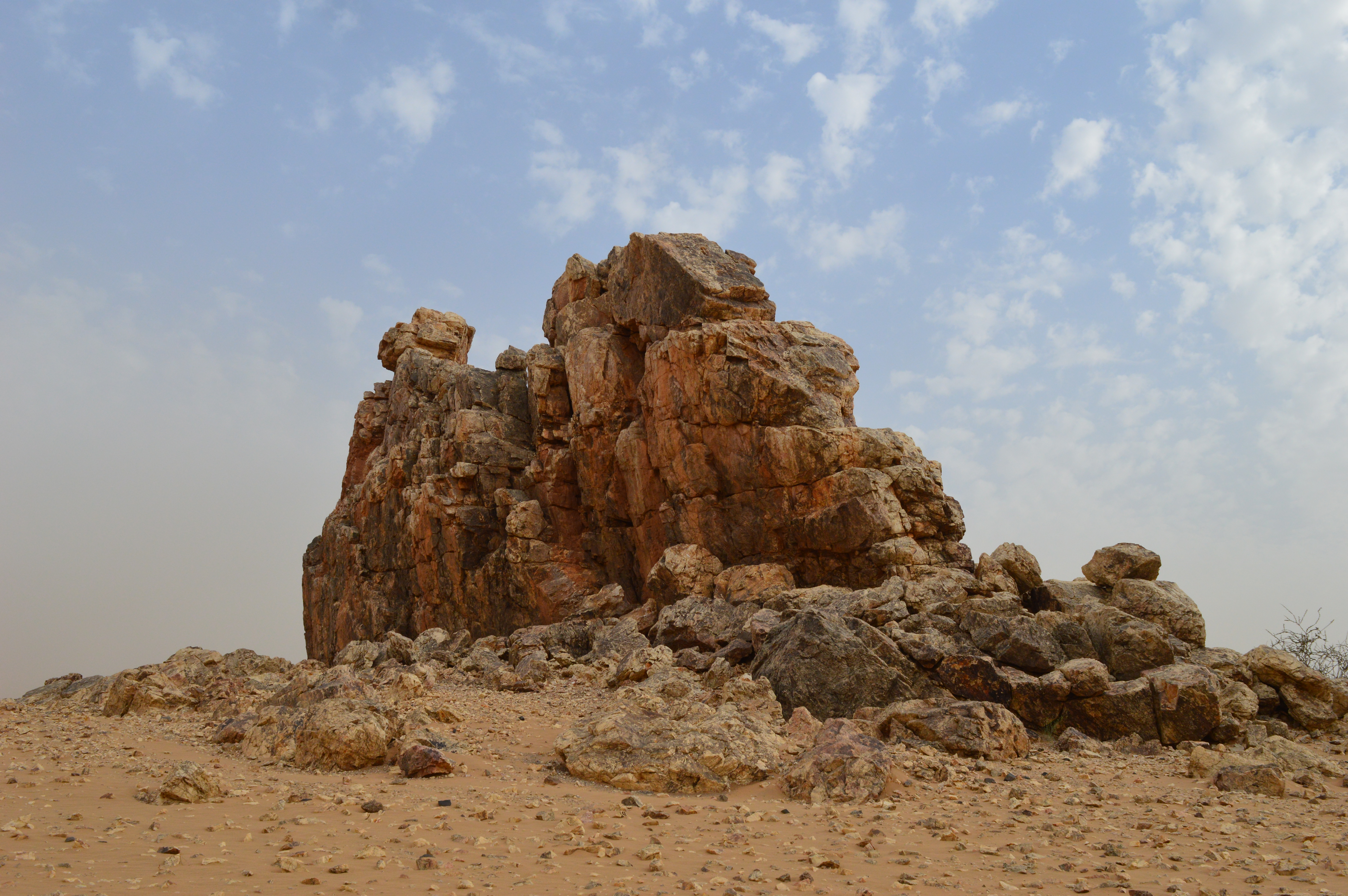
The Hagr el-Merwa at Kurgus, marking the southernmost point reached by the ancient Egyptians in Sudan. Image courtesy of Loretta Kilroe.

Kurgus: 1998–2012, 2014–2018. The first campaign of the joint SARS-British Museum project at Kurgus investigated the Hagr el-Merwa in detail, surveyed archaeological sites in the vicinity, and undertook small-scale excavations within the mud-brick fort on the riverbank and in the associated cemetery. The Hagr el-Merwa is a white quartz outcrop that dominates the right bank of the Nile 40 km upstream of the Nile bend at Abu Hamed. Carved and painted on the Hagr are many inscriptions of the Egyptian New Kingdom including two boundary stelae of the pharaohs Thutmose I and his grandson, Thutmose III. This was the southern limit of the ancient Egyptian Empire on the Nile. The most recent campaign focused on the fort and cemetery. The fort, which dates to the medieval period, measures c. 72 m^{2} and is defended by massive walls 5 m thick from which project towers at the angles and midway along each side. Recent excavations have focused on the north-west angle tower revealing many different phases as the tower was extended and remodelled. The remains are well-preserved with the west curtain wall surviving to a height of over 1 m by an arched gateway which was later blocked. Limited clearance within the fort indicated that there were extensive remains of buildings. In the cemetery, which covers an area approximately 1400 x 500 m in extent, excavations revealed a long history of use from perhaps the Kerma period through to the medieval period.

Kawa: 1997–2018. The ancient Egyptian name of Kawa, Gematon, suggests that it was founded by the pharaoh Akhenaten in the 14th century BC, although the earliest structural evidence known from the site is a temple built under Tutankhamun. The town was abandoned, probably in the 4th century AD. It was a major urban centre covering approximately 40 ha. The project conducted a detailed contour survey of the town, excavated and planned buildings, and investigated the adjacent cemetery. In winter 2013, a new phase of activity began at Kawa under the umbrella of the Qatar-Sudan Archaeological Project. Part of that project focused on ensuring the long-term survival of the site, making it more accessible to Sudanese and foreign visitors.

Survey at the Fifth Nile Cataract: 2012. In collaboration with the British Museum, the society began a survey and excavation project at the Fifth Nile Cataract in response to an appeal from the National Corporation for Antiquities and Museums, Sudan. Following the completion of the Merowe Dam at the Fourth Cataract in 2008, several more dams were planned. The one proposed at Shereik (Shereiq) will inundate the Fifth Cataract, one of the least studied reaches of the river. During the first season activities concentrated on the east bank, recording a number of cemeteries and one settlement in detail. Two settlements and a cemetery were also studied on the island of el-Usheir.

QSAP-collaborative work: 2012–2019. Several sites within the SARS concession were excavated by the British Museum. With support from the Qatar-Sudan Archaeological Project, work continued at Kawa, as well as funding three years of excavation at H25, a Kerma-New Kingdom settlement site discovered during the society's Northern Dongola Reach Survey. In 2020, work commenced at Kerma settlement sites P5 in collaboration with the University of Cardiff, UK, and R4 in collaboration with Wellesley College, Massachusetts, US.

=== Publications ===
The society publishes material largely focusing upon its archaeological research.

==== Monographs ====
- Road Archaeology in the Middle Nile: Volume 1. The SARS Survey from Bagrawiya – Meroe to Atbara 1993. by M. D. S. Mallinson, L. M. V. Smith, S. Ikram, C. Le Quesne and P. Sheehan.
- Gabati: Volume 1. A Meroitic, Post-Meroitic and Medieval Cemetery in Central Sudan by D. N. Edwards with contributions by P. J. Rose, L. M. V. Smith, S. Taylor, H. Cool, A. Clapham, Q. Mould and M. Ryder.
- Kulubnarti II. The Artifactual Remains by W.Y. Adams and N.K. Adams.
- Kulubnarti III. The Cemeteries by W. Y. Adams, N. K. Adams, D.P. Van Gerven and D.L. Greene.
- Meinarti I. The Late Meroitic Ballaña and Transitional Remains by W. Y. Adams.
- Meinarti II. The Early and Classic Christian Phases by W. Y. Adams.
- Life on the Desert Edge. Seven thousand years of settlement in the Northern Dongola Reach, Sudan. by D. A. Welsby with contributions by C. Andrews, C. Cartwright, J. Cook, Fathi Abdul Hamid, A. Grant, L. Joyner, M. Judd, M. Macklin, I. Welsby Sjöström, B. Wills and J. Woodward.
- Uncovering Ancient Sudan. A Decade of Discovery by the Sudan Archaeological Research Society edited by D. A. Welsby and W. V. Davies.
- Meinarti III. The Late and Terminal Christian Phases by W. Y. Adams.
- Survey Above the Fourth Nile Cataract by D. A. Welsby with contributions by P. Braddock and D. Usai
- Meinarti IV and V. The Church and the Cemetery; The History of Meinarti – an interpretive overview by W. Y. Adams.
- The West Bank Survey from Faras to Gemai 2. Sites of Meroitic and Ballaña Age by W. Y. Adams.
- The West Bank Survey from Faras to Gemai 3. Sites of Christian Age by W. Y. Adams.
- Hillat el-Arab. The Joint Sudanese-Italian Expedition in the Napatan Region, Sudan by I. Vincentelli with contributions by Abdel Rahman Ali Mohamed, S. Bonamore, A. Canci, M. Casali, L. Chaix, M. Cottini, M. Ferretti, E. Garcea, A. Roccati, M. Rottoli and Salah Mohamed Ahmed.
- A Neolithic Cemetery in the Northern Dongola Reach. Excavations at Site R12, edited by S. Salvatori and D. Usai.
- The Churches of Nobadia by W. Y. Adams.
- Sudan's First Railway. The Gordon Relief Expedition and The Dongola Campaign by D. A. Welsby with contributions by I. Welsby Sjöström, Mahmoud Suleiman Bashir and J. Joyce.
- Kulubnarti I. The Architectural Remains by W.Y. Adams.
- Gabati. A Meroitic, Post-Meroitic and Medieval Cemetery in Central Sudan. Volume 2 : The Physical Anthropology by M. A. Judd with a contribution by D. N. Edwards.
- The West Bank Survey from Faras to Gemai 1. Sites of Early Nubian, Middle Nubian and Pharaonic Age by H.-Å. Nordström
- Road Archaeology in the Middle Nile: Volume 2. Excavations from Meroe to Atbara 1994 by M. D. S. Mallinson and L. M. V. Smith
- A Kerma Ancien Cemetery in the Northern Dongola Reach. Excavations at Site H29 by D. A. Welsby with contributions by P. Bangsgaard, C. Cartwright, P. Ryan, I. Welsby Sjöström and R. Whiting.

==== Sudan & Nubia ====
Between 1991 and 1996, the society published a biannual newsletter with information about its work. In 1996, this was replaced by an annual peer-reviewed journal concentrating on recent archaeological fieldwork and research in Sudan. Much of the fieldwork published is the focus of the annual SARS Colloquium; however, it also includes anthropological, heritage, and modern material.
