= Qurnet Murai =

Coordinates: 25°43′35″N 32°36′13″E

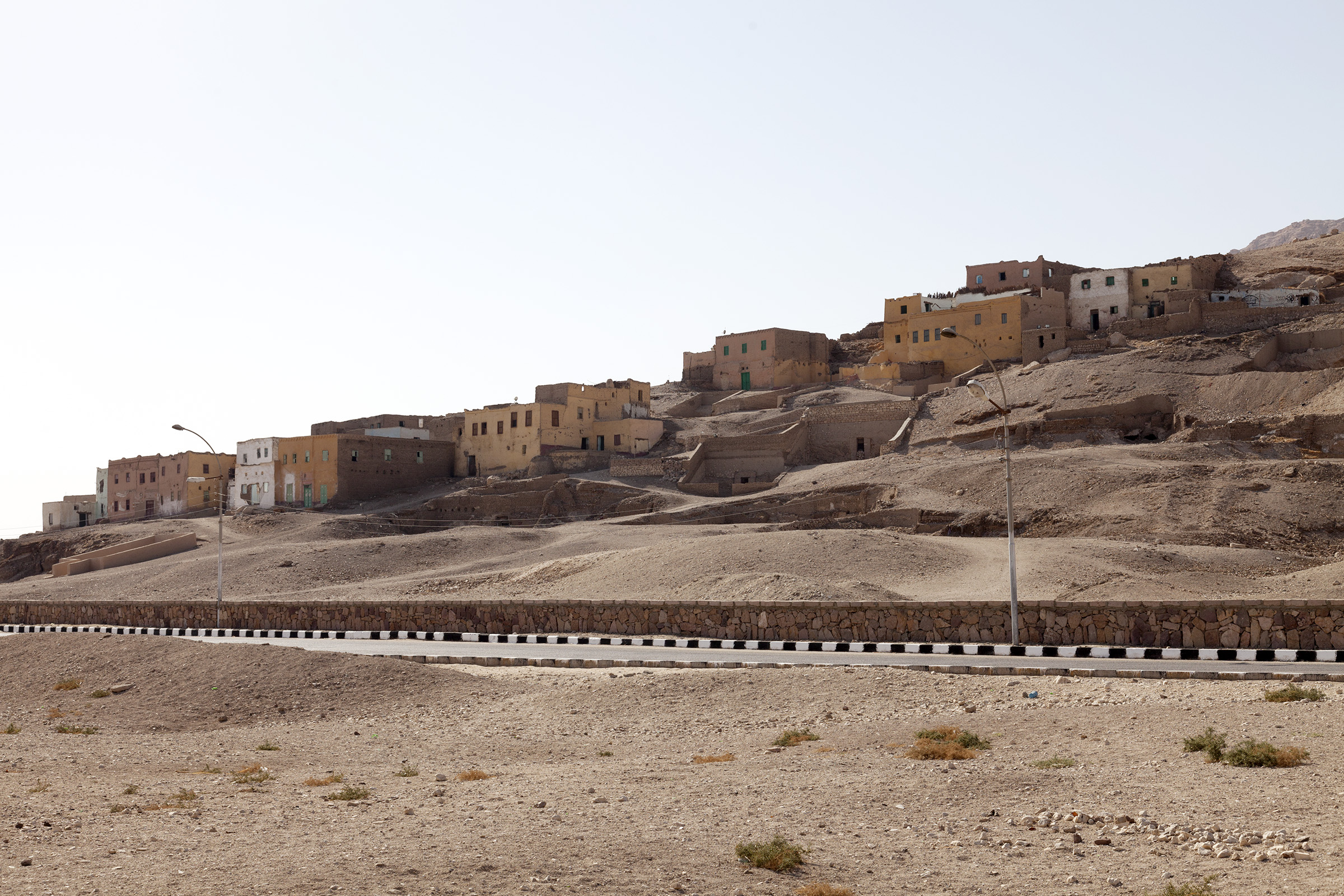
View of Qurnat Murai Village

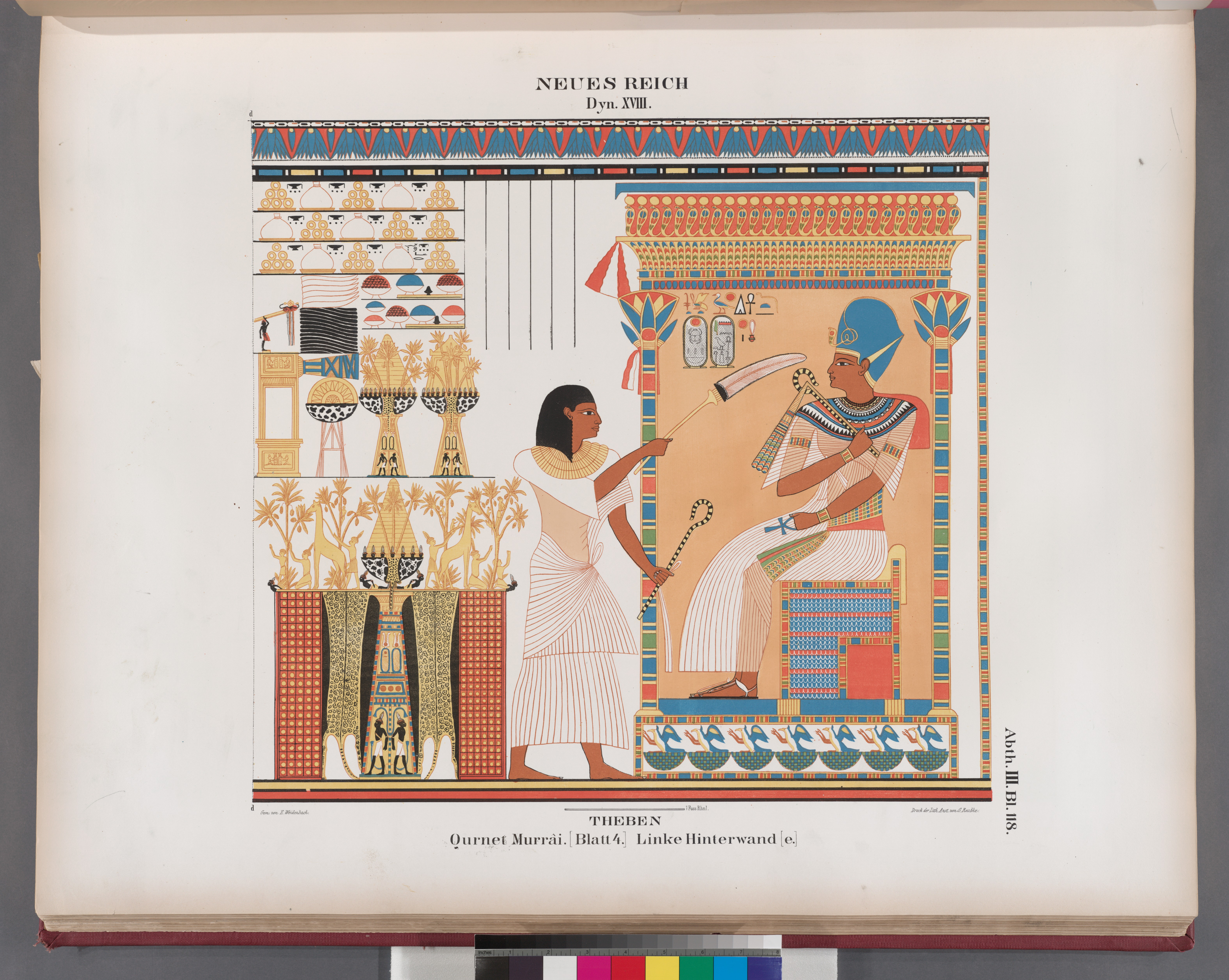
Tomb drawing from Qurnet Murai, in Lepsius's Denkmaeler aus Aegypten und Aethiopien.

Qurnet Murai is a necropolis located on the West Bank of the Nile at Thebes, Egypt, just to the south of Sheikh Abd el-Qurna.

It was also used as a cemetery for officials of the New Kingdom administration in Thebes.

== Tombs at Qurnet Murai ==
- TT40 – Amenhotep-Huy, Viceroy of Kush; reign of Tutankhamun
- TT221 – Hormin, Scribe of troops in the palace of the king on the West of Thebes; reign of Ramesses III
- TT222 – Heqamaatranakht called Turo, High priest of Monthu, 20th Dynasty
- TT223 – Karakhamon, first ka(?)–priest, Late Period
- TT235 – Userhet, High priest of Monthu, 20th Dynasty
- TT270 – Amenemwia, wab–priest, lector–priest of Ptah–Sokar, 19th Dynasty
- TT271 – Nay, Royal scribe, reign of Aye.
- TT272 – Khaemopet Divine Father of Amun in the west, lector–priest of the Sokar temple, Ramesside Period, 20th Dynasty
- TT273 – Sayemiotf, Scribe in the estate of his lord, Ramesside Period
- TT274 – Amenwahsu, High priest of Monthu of Tod and of Thebes, sem–priest in the Ramesseum in the estate of Amun, reign of Ramesses II – Merenptah, 19th dynasty
- TT275 – Sebekmose, Head wab–priest, Divine Father in the temples of king Amenhotep III and Sokar, Ramesside Period
- TT276 – Amenemopet, Overseer of the treasury of gold and silver, Judge, Overseer of the cabinet, reign of Thutmose IV, 18th Dynasty
- TT277 – Amenemonet, Divine father in the reign of king Amenhotep III, 19th Dynasty
- TT278 – Amenemheb, Herdsman of Amun–Ra, Ramesside Period, 20th Dynasty
- TT380 – Ankhefen–Re–Horakhty, Chief in Thebes, Ptolemaic Period
- TT381 – Amenemonet, Messenger of the King to every land, reign of Ramesses II
- TT382 – Usermontu, First Prophet of Monthu, reign of Ramesses II
- TT383 – Merymose, Viceroy of Kush, reign of Amenhotep III

== See also ==
- List of Theban Tombs
