= American Studies in Papyrology =

American Studies in Papyrology is a book series established in 1966 by the American Society of Papyrologists. The series editors are James Keenan (editor-in-chief), Kathleen McNamee, and Arthur Verhoogt.

== Volumes ==
=== 1960s ===
1. Essays in Honor of C. Bradford Welles, ed. A.E. Samuel. 1966.
2. Yale Papyri in the Beinecke Rare Book and Manuscript Library I, ed. John F. Oates, A.E. Samuel and C.B. Welles. New Haven and Toronto 1967. (= P. Yale 1)
3. Inventory of Compulsory Services in Ptolemaic and Roman Egypt, by N. Lewis. 1968.
4. The Taxes in Grain in Ptolemaic Egypt: Granary Receipts from Diospolis Magna, 164-88 B.C., by Z.M. Packman. 1968.
5. Euripides Papyri I, Texts from Oxyrhynchus, by B.E. Donovan. 1969.

=== 1970s ===
6. Documentary Papyri from the Michigan Collection, ed. Gerald Michael Browne. Toronto 1970. (= P.Mich. X.)
7. Proceedings of the Twelfth International Congress of Papyrology, Ann Arbor, Michigan, 12–17 August 1968, ed. D.H. Samuel. 1970.
8. The Ptolemaic and Roman Idios Logos, by P.R. Swarney. 1970.
9. Papyri from the Michigan Collection, ed. J.C. Shelton. Toronto 1971. (= P.Mich. XI.)
10. Death and Taxes: Ostraka in the Royal Ontario Museum I, ed. A.E. Samuel, W.K. Hastings, A.K. Bowman, R.S. Bagnall. Toronto 1971. (= O. Ont. Mus. I)
11. The Town Councils of Roman Egypt, by A.K. Bowman. 1971.
12. The Four Greek Hymns of Isidorus and the Cult of Isis, by V.F. Vanderlip. 1972.
13. Greek Terms for Roman Institutions: A Lexicon and Analysis, by H.J. Mason. 1974.
14. Michigan Papyri XII, ed. G.M. Browne. Toronto 1975. (= P.Mich. XII.)
15. Ostraka in the Royal Ontario Museum II, ed. R.S. Bagnall and A.E. Samuel. Toronto 1976. (= O. Ont. Mus. II)
16. Chester Beatty Biblical Papyri IV and V, by A. Pietersma. 1977.
17. Washington University Papyri I, ed. V.B. Schuman. Missoula 1980. (= P.Wash.Univ. I)
18. Imperial Estates in Egypt, by G.M. Parassoglou. Las Palmas 1978.
19. Status Declarations in Roman Egypt, by C.A. Nelson. Las Palmas 1978.
20. Fourth Century Documents from Karanis, ed. R.S. Bagnall and N. Lewis. Missoula 1979. (= P.Col. VII.)
21. Le Nome Hermopolite: toponymes et sites, by Marie Drew-Bear. Missoula 1979.

=== 1980s ===
22. Michigan Papyri XIV, ed. V.P. McCarren. Chico 1980. (= P.Mich. XIV.)
23. Proceedings of the Sixteenth International Congress of Papyrology, ed. R.S. Bagnall, G.M. Browne, A.E. Hanson and L. Koenen. Chico 1981.
24. Yale Papyri in the Beinecke Rare Book and Manuscript Library II, ed. S.A. Stephens. Chico 1985.
25. Register of Oxyrhynchites, 30 B.C.-A.D. 96, by B.W. Jones and J.E.G. Whitehorne. 1983.
26. Saite and Persian Demotic Cattle Documents, A Study in Legal Forms and Principles in Ancient Egypt, by E. Cruz-Uribe. 1985.
27. Grundlagen des koptischen Satzbaus, by H.J. Polotsky 1987.

=== 1990s ===
28. Columbia Papyri VIII, ed. R.S. Bagnall, T.T. Renner and K.A. Worp. Atlanta 1990. (= P.Col. VIII.)
29. Grundlagen des koptischen Satzbaus, zweite Halfte, by H.J. Polotsky. 1990.
30. Michigan Papyri XVI, A Greek Love Charm from Egypt (P.Mich. 757), ed. and comm. by David G. Martinez. Atlanta 1991. (= P.Mich. XVI.)
31. Ptocheia or Odysseus in Disguise at Troy (P.Koln 245), ed. and comm. by M.G. Parca. 1991.
32. Un Codex fiscal Hermopolite (P.Sorb. II 69), ed. J. Gascou. Atlanta 1994. (= P. Sorb. II)
33. On Government and Law in Roman Egypt, by Naphtali Lewis, ed. A.E. Hanson. Atlanta 1995.
34. Columbia Papyri X, ed. by R.S. Bagnall and D. Obbink. Atlanta 1996.
35. The Michigan Medical Codex (P. Mich. XVII 753), by Louise C. Youtie. Atlanta 1996.
36. Writing, Teachers and Students in Graeco-Roman Egypt, by Raffaella Cribiore. Atlanta 1996.
37. The Herakleopolite Nome: A Catalogue of the Toponyms with Introduction and Commentary by Maria Rosaria Falivene. 1998.
38. Columbia Papyri XI by Timothy M. Teeter. 1998.
39. Columbia Papyri IX: The Vestis Miltaris Codex by Jennifer Sheridan. 1999.

=== 2000s ===
40. Papyri in Memory of P. J. Sijpesteijn edited by A. J. B. Sirks and K. A. Worp, asst. editors R.S. Bagnall and R.P. Salomons. ISBN 978-0-9700591-0-9
41. A Yale Papyrus (PYale III 137) in the Beinecke Rare Book and Manuscript Library III by Paul Schubert. 2001. ISBN 0-9700591-1-6. Full text at the Ancient World Digital Library
42. Essays and Texts in Honor of J. David Thomas. Ed. by Traianos Gagos and Roger S. Bagnall. 2001. ISBN 0-9700591-3-2
43. It is our Father who writes: Orders from the Monastery of Apollo at Bawit by Sarah J Clackson. ISBN 978-0-9700591-5-4
44. Greek Documentary Papyri from Egypt in the Berlin Aegyptisches Museum (P.Berl.Cohen) by Nahum Cohen. 2007; ISBN 978-0-9700591-6-1
45. Annotations in Greek and Latin Texts from Egypt by K McNamee. ISBN 978-0-9700591-7-8
46. Papyri and Essays in memory of Sarah Clackson, ed. Boudhors et al. ISBN 978-0-9700591-8-5.
47. In Pursuit of Invisibility: Ritual Texts from Late Roman Egypt by Richard Phillips. ISBN 978-0-9700591-9-2.

=== 2010s ===
48. To Mega Biblion: Book-Ends, End-Titles, and Coronides in Papyri with Hexametric Poetry by Francesca Schironi. ISBN 978-0-9799758-0-6.
49. A Transportation Archive from Fourth-Century Oxyrhynchus (P. Mich. XX0), ed. P. J. Sijpesteijn and Klaas A. Worp with the assistance of Traianos Gagos and Arthury Verhoogt. ISBN 978-0-9799758-3-7. 2011.
50. Propsopography of Byzantine Aphrodito, by Giovanni Roberto Ruffini. ISBN 978-0-9799758-2-0. 2011.
51. Sixth-century Tax Register from the Hermopolite Nome, by Roger S. Bagnall, James G. Keenan, Leslie S. B. MacCoull. ISBN 978-0-9799758-4-4. 2011.
52. New Epigrams of Palladas: A Fragmentary Papyrus Codex (P.CtYBR inv. 4000) by Kevin Wilkinson. 2013.
53. Papyrological Texts in Honor of Roger S. Bagnall, ed. Rodney Ast, Hélène Cuvigny, Todd Hickey, Julia Lougovaya. ISBN 9780979975868. 2013.
