= Mashakeila =

Mashakeila ⲙⲁϣⲁⲕⲉ̄ⲗⲁ
- Village
- Interactive map of Mashakeila
- Location within Sudan
- Coordinates: 19°56′00″N 30°28′00″E
- Country: Sudan
- State: Northern
- Time zone: UTC+2 (CAT)

Mashakeila or Mashakela (Nobiin: ⲙⲁϣⲁⲕⲉ̄ⲗⲁ; Arabic: مشكيلة) is a village in Northern State, Sudan. It's located on the eastern bank of the Nile near the Third Cataract, It is part of the Delgo Locality. Mashakeila is one of the largest villages in the Mahas region.

== Toponymy ==
The name Mashakeila is believed to originate from the Nobiin words Masha, meaning 'Sun' and, keila meaning 'limit', this translates to 'the sun's limit'.

An alternative etymology is suggested by Ali Osman, an archaeologist and a native of the village. He proposes that Mashakeila is made up of two Nobiin words, Masha (Mishi) meaning great, and keila (Kul- la), meaning hafier. Osman bases this etymology on the Funj administrative system to divide regions they rule over into hafiers. The Funj would've ruled over Mashakeila and the areas north of the Third Cataract from 1530–1550 until 1580.
