= Aswan Governorate =

Governorate of Egypt

Aswān Governorate
- Governorate
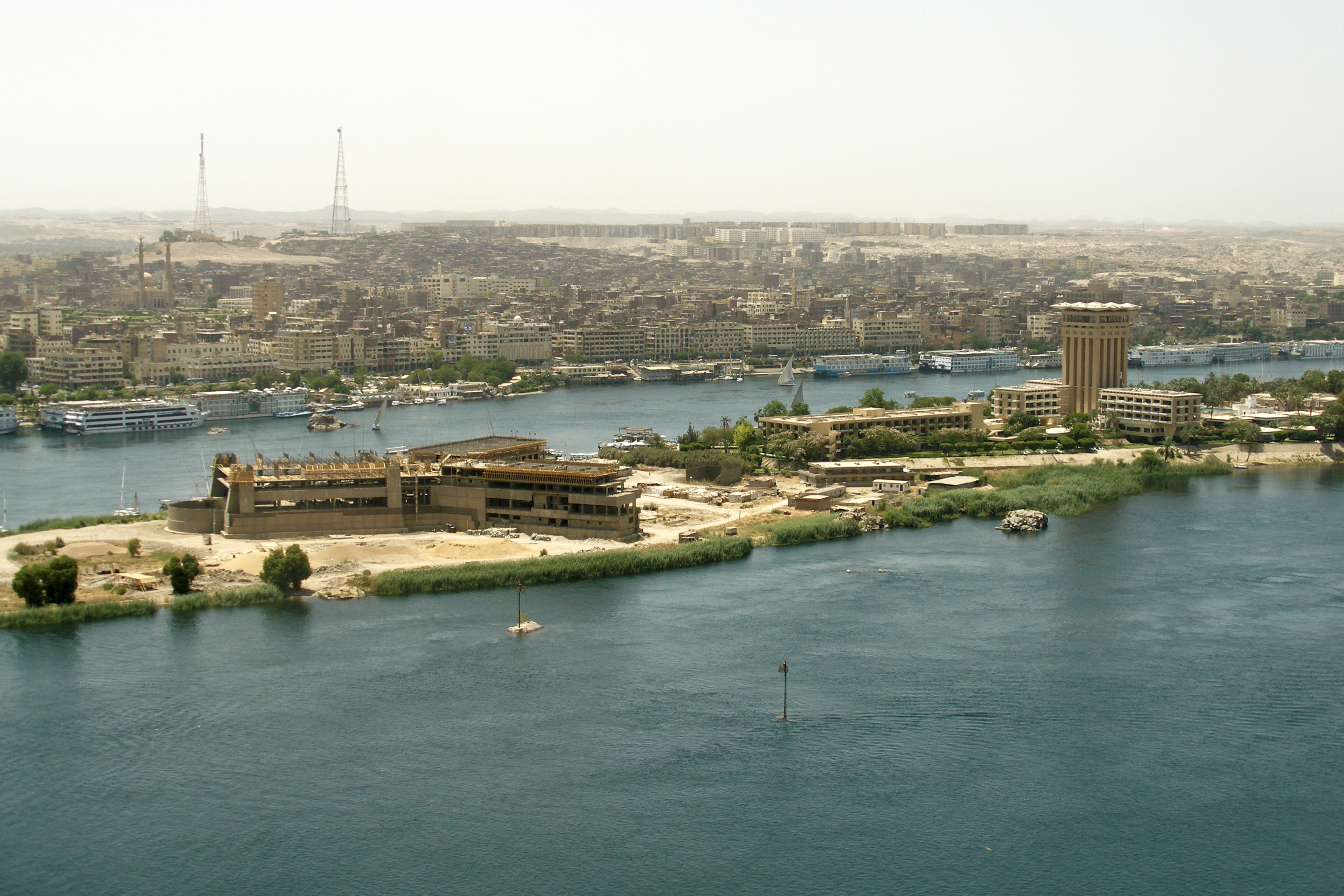
- View of the city of Aswan

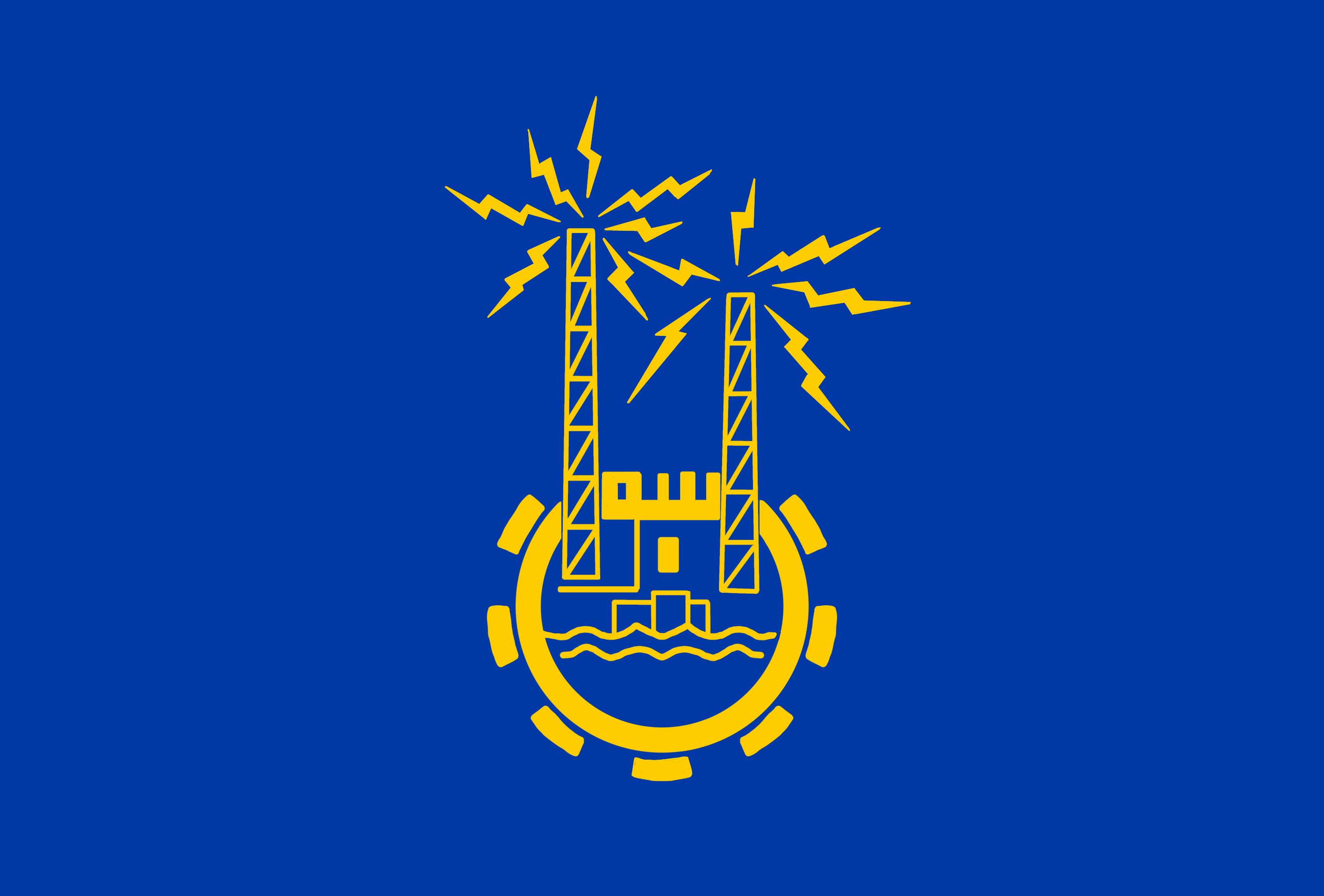
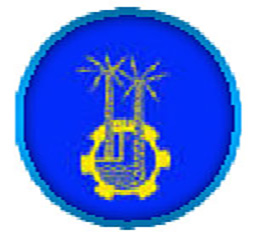
- Flag

- Aswan Governorate on the map of Egypt
- Coordinates: 23.59°N 32.82°E
- Country: Egypt
- Seat: Aswan (capital)

Government
  - Governor: Amr Helmy Hassan Lashin

Area
  - Total: 62,726 km^{2} (24,219 sq mi)

Population (January 2024)
  - Total: 1,685,743
  - Density: 26.875/km^{2} (69.605/sq mi)

GDP
  - Total: E£76 billion (US$4.9 billion)
- Time zone: UTC+2 (EGY)
  - Summer (DST): UTC+3 (EEST)
- ISO 3166 code: EG-ASN
- HDI (2021): 0.724 high · 15th
- Website: www.aswan.gov.eg

Aswan Governorate (Arabic: محافظة أسوان, romanized: Muḥāfaẓat Aswan) is one of the 27 governorates of Egypt. It is the southernmost governorate in Upper Egypt, covering most of the area of Lake Nasser. Its capital is Aswan.

Aswan Governorate is bordered by Qena Governorate to the north, the Red Sea Governorate to the east, the New Valley Governorate to the west, and Sudan's Northern state to the south.

According to the latest estimates, the governorate has a population of approximately 1,685,743 inhabitants (as of January 2024) and occupies a total area of 62,726 square kilometres (24,219 sq mi), ranking it among the largest governorates in Egypt by area.

The current governor is Amr Helmy Hassan Lashin, who was appointed on February 16th 2026.

== History ==
The region of present day Aswan Governorate has been inhabited for millennia. It served as the southern frontier of ancient Egypt. The area was known as Swenett in antiquity, a name derived from the ancient Egyptian symbol for trade. Its location at the First Cataract of the Nile made it a natural boundary and a strategic gateway for trade caravans.

Aswan was the source of the granite used for many ancient Egyptian monuments. The Unfinished Obelisk in its quarry demonstrates ancient stone working techniques. The city on Elephantine Island was an important administrative center with a fortress guarding the southern border.

During the Greco-Roman period, the Temple of Philae was constructed and dedicated to the goddess Isis. It remained a site of worship after the Christianization of Egypt. Recent archaeological missions have discovered rock cut tombs from this period near the Aga Khan Mausoleum.

In the 20th century, dam construction permanently altered the region. The Aswan Low Dam was completed in 1902. The Aswan High Dam, completed in 1970, created Lake Nasser. This led to the UNESCO coordinated relocation of several monuments, including the temples of Abu Simbel and Philae. The project also involved resettling the local Nubian population.

== Geography ==
Aswan Governorate is located in southern Egypt and represents the country's southernmost administrative division. It contains a large portion of Lake Nasser, one of the world's largest artificial lakes. The governorate covers 62,726 square kilometers, ranking among Egypt's largest governorates by area.

The governorate shares borders with Qena Governorate to the north, Red Sea Governorate to the east, New Valley Governorate to the west, and Sudan's Northern state to the south. The Nile River flows through the region, creating a narrow fertile valley surrounded by arid desert terrain.

The First Cataract of the Nile is located near Aswan city. Sandstone formations characterize the eastern and western deserts. Islands within the Nile include Elephantine Island, Sehel Island, and Philae Island. The completion of the Aswan High Dam formed Lake Nasser, which altered the southern geography of the governorate by submerging some areas while creating new water resources in the desert environment.

The eastern bank of the Nile contains more populated areas, while the western bank consists primarily of desert landscapes.

== Climate ==
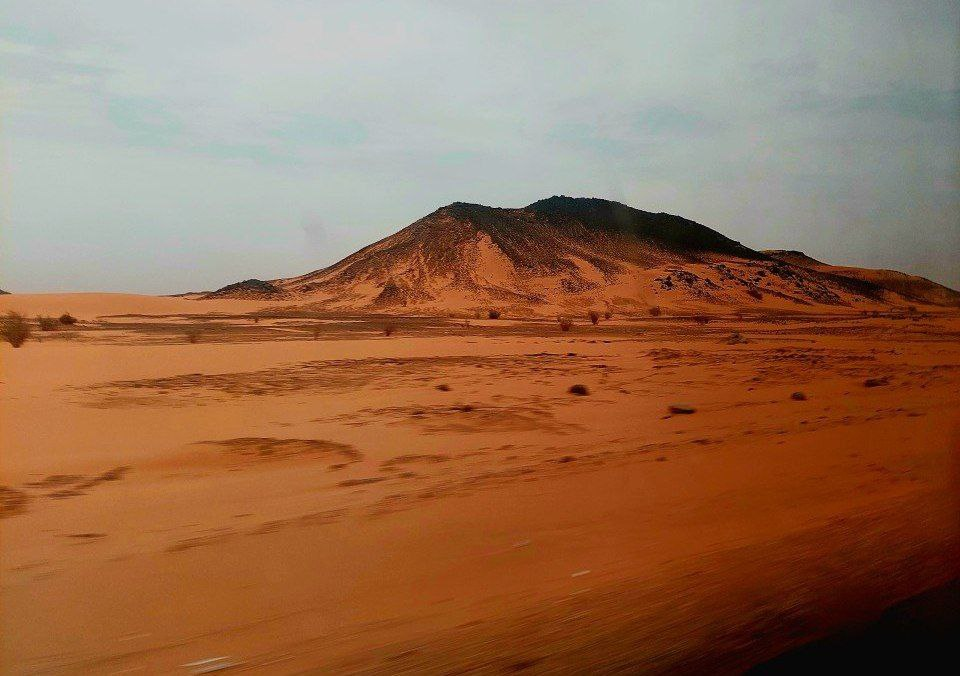
Nubian desert

Aswan Governorate has a hot desert climate (Köppen climate classification BWh). The region experiences extreme aridity with minimal rainfall throughout the year. Summer months from May to September are particularly hot, with average high temperatures regularly reaching approximately 40°C (104°F).

Winter months from November to February bring milder conditions, with average highs around 22-25°C (72-77°F). The area receives abundant sunshine year-round with minimal cloud cover. Rainfall is scarce, with some years experiencing no measurable precipitation. The region is also subject to occasional sandstorms, known as khamsin, which typically occur during spring months and can reduce visibility while increasing temperatures temporarily.

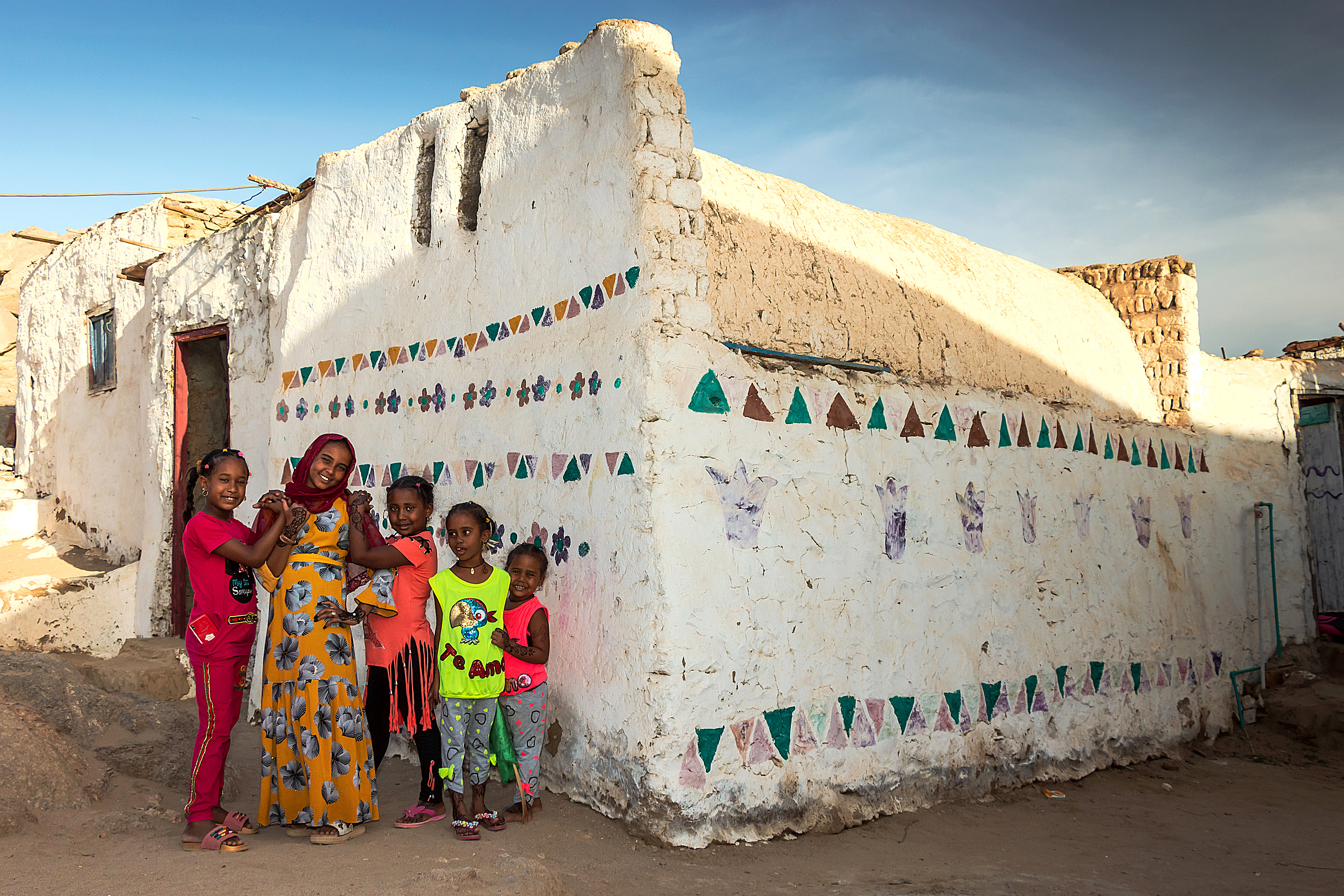
Colourful houses on Heisa Island

== Demographics ==
According to the Central Agency for Public Mobilization and Statistics (CAPMAS), the population of Aswan Governorate was estimated to be 1,685,743 as of January 2024. This places it among the less densely populated governorates in Egypt, with a density of approximately 26.875 people per square kilometer.

The population includes a substantial rural component, with many residents living in villages along the Nile River. The governorate is a cultural center for Egypt's Nubian community, with many Nubian villages located both north and south of Aswan city. The native Nubian languages, Nobiin and Kenzi, are spoken alongside Arabic.

The demographic landscape has been shaped by historical events, particularly the relocation of Nubian communities during the construction of the Aswan High Dam and the subsequent creation of Lake Nasser. This led to the displacement of many Nubian people to new areas, both within the governorate and in other parts of Egypt.

== Municipal divisions ==
The governorate is organized into several municipal divisions for administrative purposes, with an estimated population of 1,685,743 as of January 2024. In some cases, a markaz and a kism share the same name.

Municipal Divisions
Anglicized name	Native name	Arabic transliteration	Population (January 2023 Est.)	Type
Abu Simbel	مركز أبو سمبل	Abū Simbil	8,317	Markaz
Aswan	مركز أسوان	Aswān	73,387	Markaz
Aswan 1	قسم اول أسوان	Aswān 1	188,712	Kism (fully urban)
Aswan 2	قسم ثان أسوان	Aswān 2	208,408	Kism (fully urban)
Daraw	مركز دراو	Daraw	151,380	Markaz
Edfu	مركز أدفو	Idfū	499,577	Markaz
Kom Ombo	مركز كوم امبو	Kawm Umbū	418,006	Markaz
New Aswan	مدينة أسوان الجديدة	Madīnat Aswān al-Jadīdah	118	New City
New Tushka	مدينة توشكى الجديدة	Madīnat Tūshka al-Jadīdah		New City
Nasr	مركز نصر	Naṣr	95,306	Markaz

== Cities ==
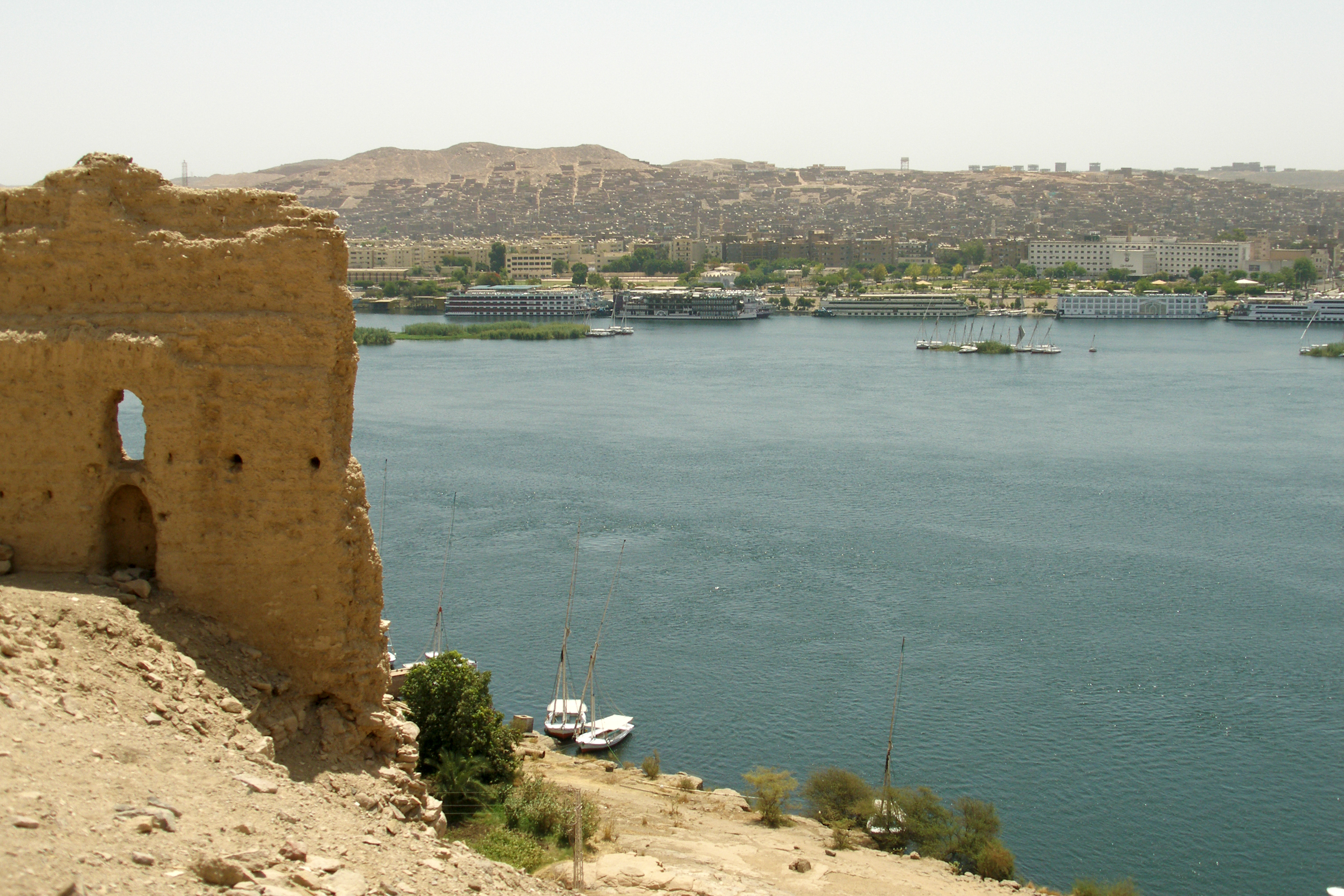
View of Aswan from west bank

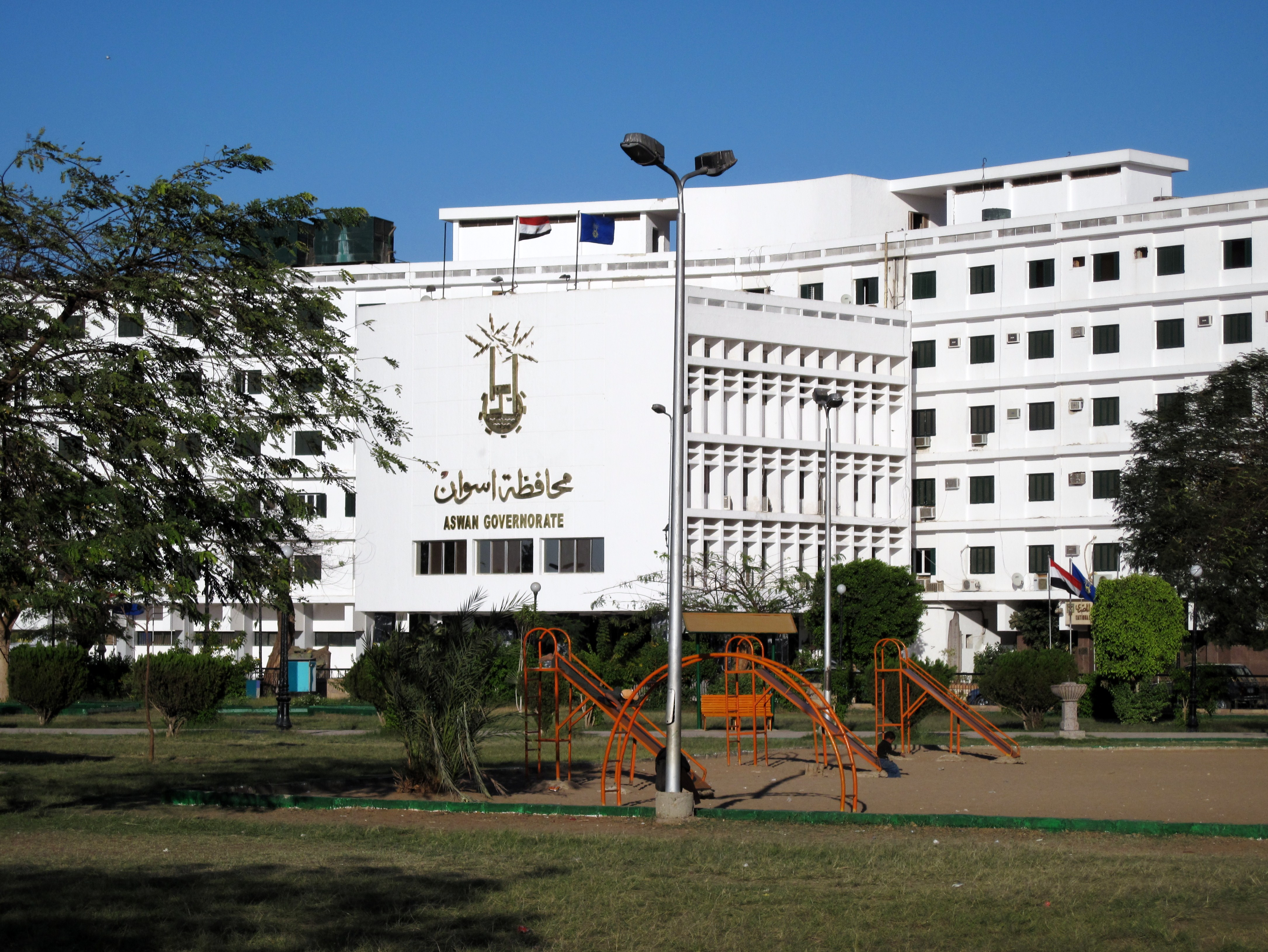
Aswan Governorate building

The following are in Aswan Governorate.

- Aswan
- Daraw
- Edfu
- Kom Ombo
- New Aswan
- New Kalabsha
- Sebaiya

== Industrial zone ==
According to the Egyptian Governing Authority for Investment and Free Zones (GAFI) the following industrial zones are located in Aswan:

Zone name
El Shalalat El Awlaqi Valley Industrial Zone

== Important sites ==
- Abu Simbel
- Kalabsha
- Elkab
- Temple of Kom Ombo
- Qasr Ibrim
- Philae Temple

== See also ==
- Governorates of Egypt
