= J. David Thomas =

British papyrologist (1931–2026)

John David Thomas, FBA (23 June 1931 – 7 June 2026), usually known as J. David Thomas, was a British papyrologist and classical scholar. He was Professorial Fellow in Papyrology at Durham University between 1990 and 1992. Thomas completed his undergraduate education at Worcester College, Oxford, and then carried out doctoral studies at the University of Wales. He lectured at the University College of Wales, Aberystwyth, from 1955 to 1966, when he was appointed to a lectureship in palaeography at Durham. Thomas remained there and was promoted to a readership in papyrology in 1977, before his appointed to the professorial fellowship in 1990. After retiring in 1992, he was an emeritus professor at Durham. Thomas died on 7 June 2026, at the age of 94.

== Honours and awards ==
In 1989, Thomas was elected a Fellow of the British Academy, the United Kingdom's national academy for the humanities and social sciences. He was the subject of a Festschrift edited by Traianos Gagos and Roger S. Bagnall: Essays and Texts in Honor of J. David Thomas (2001), published by the University of Michigan Press as the 42nd volume in its American Studies in Papyrology series. He was awarded the Chancellor's Medal by the Senate of Durham University in 2017.

== Publications ==
- The Epistrategos in Ptolemaic and Roman Egypt, Papyrologica Coloniensia, no. 6 (Westdeutscher Verlag, in two parts, 1975 and 1982).
- (Co-authored with Alan K. Bowman) Vindolanda: The Latin Writing Tablets, Britannia Monograph Series, no. 4 (Society for the Promotion of Roman Studies, 1983).
- (Co-authored with Alan K. Bowman) The Vindolanda Writing-Tablets (Tabulae Vindolandenses), vols. 2–3 (British Museum Press, 1994 and 2003). Bowman, Thomas and Roger Tomlin published critical editions of the remaining tablets in 2010 and 2011 in the journal Britannia (vol. 41, pp. 187–224, and vol. 42, pp. 113–144).

Thomas made contributions to several of the volumes of edited Oxyrhynchus Papyri published between 1971 and 2013, and was general editor for volumes 66 and 67. He also edited the third and final volume of A Descriptive Catalogue of the Greek Papyri in the Collection of Wilfred Merton, F.S.A., which was published as a supplement to the 18th issue of the Bulletin of the Institute of Classical Studies, University of London, in 1967.
