= Heisa Island =

Island in Egypt

Native name: جزيرة هيصة
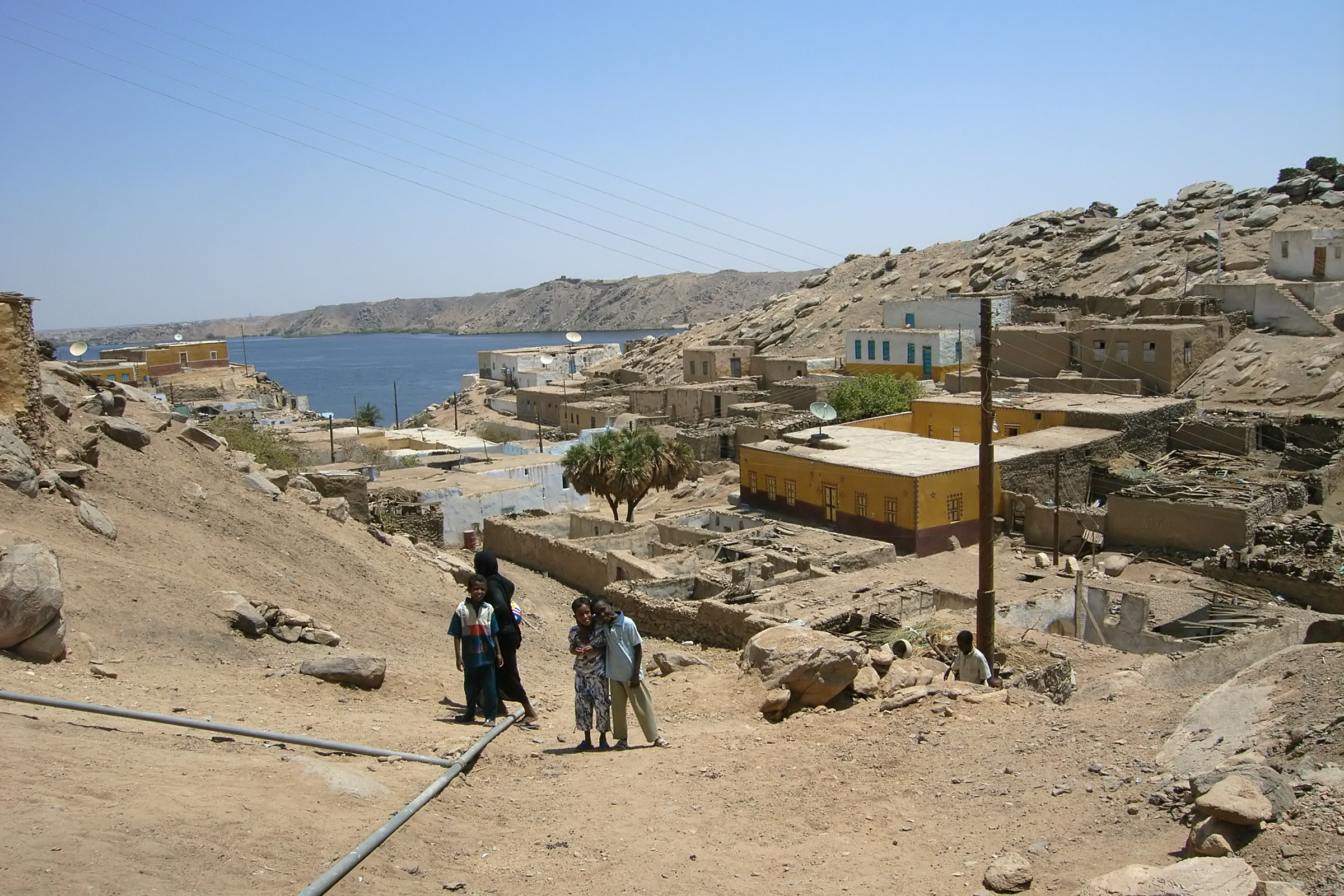

- Location in Egypt

Geography
- Location: Nile River
- Coordinates: 24.0145°N 32.8768°E
- Adjacent to: Nile

Administration
- Egypt

Heisa Island or el-Heissa (Arabic: جزيرة هيصة) is an inhabited basaltic island situated at the former First Cataract of the Nile River in historic Nubia within the Aswan Governorate of southern Egypt. The approximately 2 km long island has been situated in the reservoir of the Aswan Low Dam since the dam's initial completion in 1902. The Heisans speak Kenzi Nubian.

== Geography ==
Heisa is the largest island between the Aswan Low Dam and the Aswan High Dam south of Aswan. It is located southwest of Bigeh Island and the Philae temple complex, There is a village, home of 2000 Nubians in the southern half of the island. While other villages surrounding it were evacuated from the area upon the construction of the Aswan High Dam, Heisa's people stayed, moving to higher ground instead while most of their farmland was lost under water.

Their one-story houses, built on rocky hills, are spacious and painted in bright colors, some with domes mirroring the traditional Nubian architecture. The northern part of the island is characterized by rocky landscapes.

Very few engravings and artifacts have been found on the island, even though it played an important role in the past as the burial grounds for priests on the temples at Philae.
