= Hints from Hesiod =

1883 translation of Hesiod's Works and Days, and a work by Horace

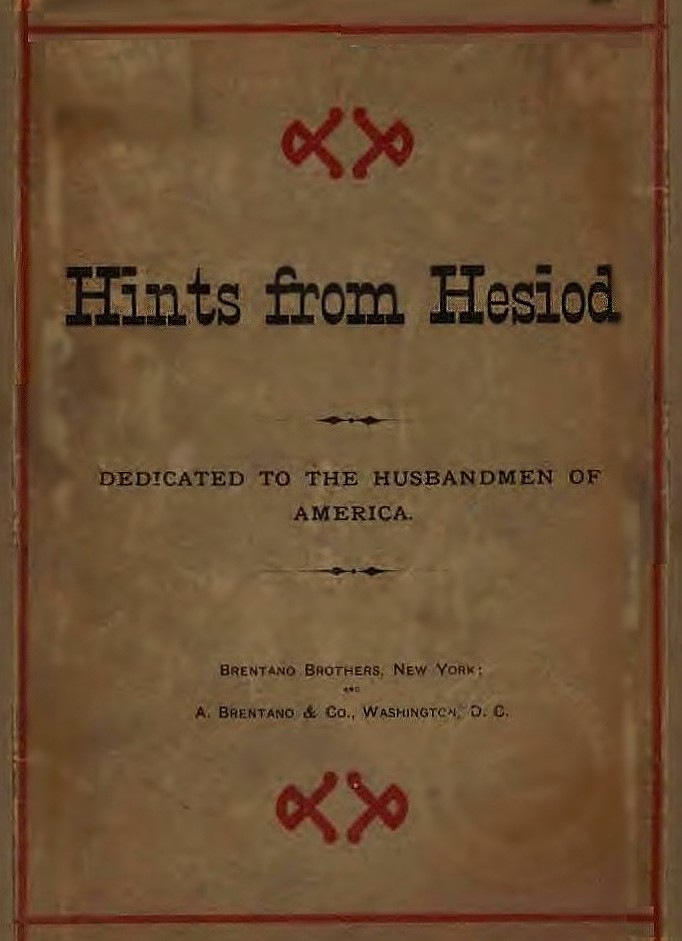
- Cover
- Author: Hesiod; Horace
- Translator: An Officer of the U.S. Treasury Dept.
- Language: English
- Publisher: Brentano Bros.
- Publication date: 1883
- Publication place: United States
- Media type: Print
- Pages: 60
- OCLC: 17817477
- Text: Hints from Hesiod at Wikisource

Hints from Hesiod is an 1883 translation of Hesiod's Works and Days, along with Horace's "Praises of Rural Life," by an Officer of the United States Treasury Department. It also contains prefatory arguments, a large set of notes, and a substantial appendix.

== Background ==
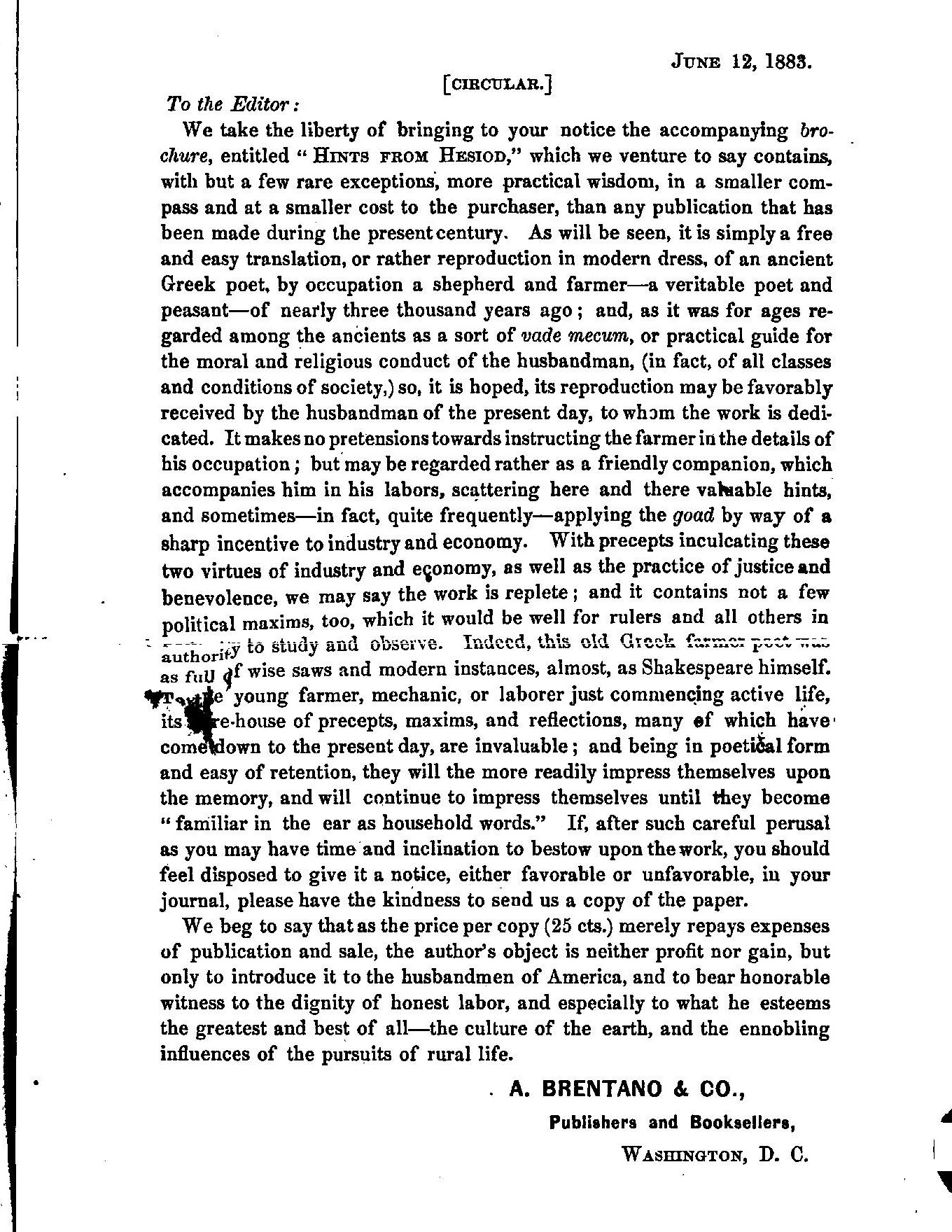
Circular for Hints from Hesiod.

Works and Days is a poem which was written by the ancient Greek poet Hesiod, around 700 BC, and it is described as a farmer's almanac in which Hesiod instructs his brother Perses in the agricultural arts. The work is recount of two myths, first, the story of Prometheus and Pandora, and the second, the Myth of the Five Ages. It is also noted for containing one of the earliest, illustrated accounts of historical vegetarianism, where humanity was strictly non-violent during the Golden Age, and that there was still a "primitive innocence," during the Silver Age where there was abstinence from the slaughter of animals in the preparation of their food, nor did they offer sacrifices. (Note: The American classicist and ancient historian C. Bradford Welles writes that in Works and Days, Hesiod aligns himself with both a nightingale, "thinking of his own ill treatment at the hands of the gift-devouring nobles, and the moral which they are to deduce from the story is that they ought to be nice to him, poor man," as well as the hawk, who "ought to release its god-given meal and take to a vegetarian diet." Welles notes, that in his diet, Hesiod has failed to take his own advice.)

Horace's "Praises of the Rural Life," itself an excerpt a larger work from his Third Book of Odes written around 23 BC, appears in Hints from Hesiod.

There was a distributation of circulars for the book before it was sold. Say the publishers, it is a "modern dress of [a work from the] ancient Greek poet, by occupation a shepherd and farmer-a veritable poet and peasant nearly three thousand years ago; and, as it was for ages regarded among the ancients as a sort of vade mecum, or practical guide for the moral and religious conduct of the husbandman, (in fact, of all classes and conditions of society,) so, it is hoped, its reproduction may be favorably received by the husbandman of the present day, to whom the work is dedicated it makes no pretention towards instructing the farmer in the details of his occupation; but may be regarded rather as a friendly companion which accompanies him in his labors, scattering here and there valuable hints, and sometimes, in fact quite frequently-applying the goad by way of a sharp incentive to industry economy."

== Publication ==
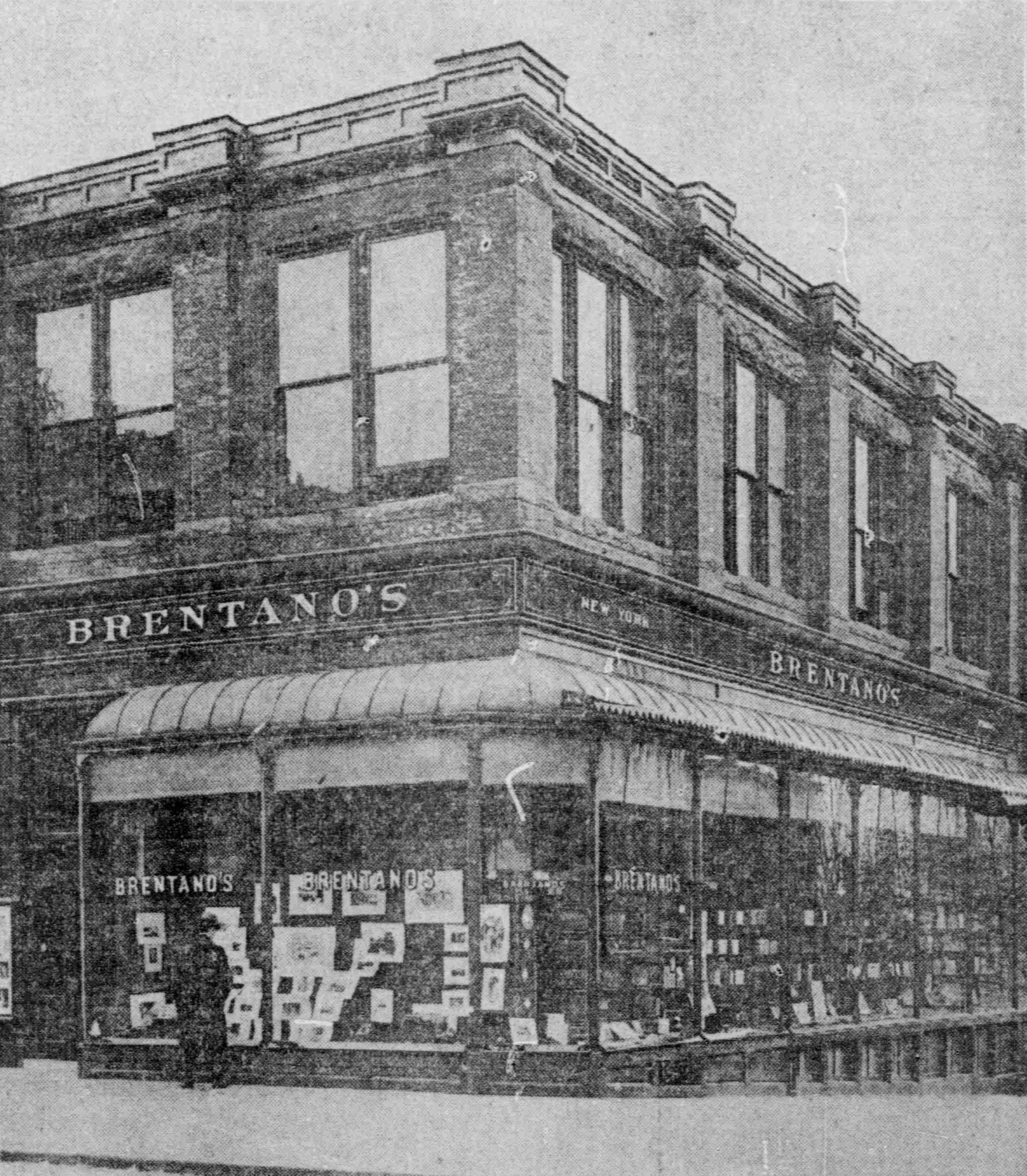
Brentano's in Washington D.C., 1906.

Hints from Hesiod, also fully entitled Hints from the Works and Days, or, Moral, economical and agricultural maxims and reflections of Hesiod: to which is added The praises of rural life from Horace is a 18 cm softcover book, which was printed by the Brentano Bros., in 1883. At 60 pages in total length, Hints from Hesiod is a translation of Hesiod's Erga kai hemerai, and "Praises of a Rural Life" by Horace, done by an Officer of the United States Treasury Department, who dedicated the work to "the Husbandmen of America." It is held at public and university libraries in Canada, the United States, and Spain.

In the year of its publication, Hints from Hesiod was sold for the cost of 25 cents. It was also offered at no cost to the husbandmen of America, as a "free translation on some of the wise saws of an old Greek farmer-poet."

=== Content ===
Hints from Hesiod opens with a prologue, a fifty line poem written by the Officer, who gives an account of the life and writings of Hesiod, which is followed by the section "A General Argument of the Poem." Works and Days is split into two sections, which each contain their own additional argument by the Officer. "Praises of the Rural Life," by Horace, comes next, and then there is a section for notes, and seven sections of appendices, which are over eighteen pages in length. The work closes with seventeen lines from "Childe Harold," in Canto II, by George Gordon Byron. Throughout the work, there are eleven unique illustrations.

== Reception ==
Several reviews for the Hints from Hesiod occurred in the year of its publication. The Christian Union writes in a July 5 edition the "Brentano Bros. have just issued in pamphlet form "Hints from Hesiod," a republication in modern dress of the thoughts and reflections of the old Greek poet on the life of the husbandman," adding that it "is full of ancient axioms and contains not a little real wisdom." The July 7th edition of evangelical academic journal The Churchman writes that Hints from Hesiod is a "cheap form [...] rhymed translation of Hesiod's moral, economical, and agricultural maxims and reflections [which] should be gladly welcomed by the husbandmen of America," while a July 27 edition of the Kansas Farmer writes that it is "not a ready reference book, but it would be very entertaining for young people on the farm."

The weekly magazine The Nation notes, that along with the a recent translation of the Geoponica, Brentano's Hints from Hesiod marked a resurgent interest "of the technical treatises of the ancients, the agricultural are among the most attractive for moderns [and] we Americans are not dead to the feeling, and only a few months since [its] publication." The following year, the news magazine Publishers Weekly calls Hints from Hesiod a "practical guide and friendly companion, and as bearing honorable witness to the dignity of honest labor, and the ennobling influences of the pursuits of rural life."
