= Bible translations into Nubian =

The Bible was translated into Old Nubian during the period when Christianity was dominant in Nubia (southern Egypt and northern Sudan). Throughout the Middle Ages, Nubia was divided into separate kingdoms: Nobadia, Makuria and Alodia. Old Nubian was the standard written form in all three kingdoms. Of the living Nubian languages, it is modern Nobiin which is the closest to Old Nubian and probably its direct descendant.

The date of the first translation of the Bible into Old Nubian is unknown. Probably it was not long after the establishment of Christianity in the sixth century. The Nubian Bible was translated from the original Greek in the case of the New Testament and in the case of the Old Testament (Hebrew Bible) mainly from the Septuagint (the earliest Greek translation) with possibly some input from the Hexapla (which included the original Hebrew as well as the Septuagint and four other texts). With the Islamization of Nubia in the 14th and 15th centuries, the Nubian Bible was lost. No complete Nubian Bible survives today.

All of the Old Nubian biblical fragments, including quotations of the Bible in other works, have been gathered and edited by G. Michael Browne (1994). Portions of the Bible were translated into Nobiin between 1860 and 1899.

== Discovery of texts ==
In 1906, Carl Schmidt rediscovered the Nubian Bible in Cairo when he purchased sixteen pages of a parchment codex containing parts of a lectionary for the Christmas season, December 20–26. The biblical readings are drawn from the Apostolos (specifically Romans, Galatians, Philippians and Hebrews) and the Gospels (Matthew and John). The sequence and selection of texts are unique and unlike those of any known Greek or Coptic lectionary except for the readings for December 25, which are the same as those of the Greek menologia.

Sixteen fragments of the Nubian Bible were subsequently found in the ruins of the cathedral of Qasr Ibrim. These include passages from John, Philippians, Hebrews, 1 Corinthians, Revelation and Psalms. Some of the Psalms 149 and 150 are recorded with verses alternating between Greek and Nubian translation. This format is also found in fragments of Psalms and Daniel found at Old Dongola and possibly made by the same scribe as the Qasr Ibrim fragments. These bilingual texts were probably not intended for public reading but for the private edification of the scholarly class, which was fluent in both languages. Also recovered from Qasr Ibrim was a six-word fragment identified by Browne as belonging to a Nubian translation of the Syriac Diatessaron of Tatian. It was published by Browne under a pseudonym and its authenticity has been questioned.

Fragments of Mark and Luke have been recovered from the island of Sunnarti (near Kulb). There are also biblical passages in the Nubian translation of Pseudo-Chrysostom.

Several Old Nubian biblical texts have been found on ostraka and wooden planks similar to those from the pre-Christian period. These may have had an apotropaic (magical) function carried over from the Isaic religion. Something similar may be behind the arrays of texts in Greek, Coptic and Old Nubian, including Old Nubian biblical texts and some magical signs, that cover the interior of the tomb of Archbishop George of Dongola (died 1113).

== Sources ==
- Browne, C. S. (2004). "Tatianus Nubianus". In Stephen M. Bay (ed.). Studia Palaeophilologica: Proferessoris G. M. Browne in honorem oblata. Stipes Publishing. pp. 91–98.
- Browne, Gerald M. (1981). "An Old Nubian Version of Mark 11.6–11". Zeitschrift für Papyrologie und Epigraphik (44): 155–66.
- Browne, Gerald M. (1982). Griffith's Old Nubian Lectionary. Rome: Biblical Institute Press.
- Browne, Gerald M. (1985). "Old Nubian Philology". Zeitschrift für Papyrologie und Epigraphik (60): 291–96.
- Browne, Gerald M. (1986). "The Sunnarti Mark". Zeitschrift für Papyrologie und Epigraphik (66): 49–52.
- Browne, Gerald M. (1987). "Two Old Nubian Texts from Old Dongola". Bulletin du Musée Nationale de Varsovie. 28: 76–86.
- Browne, Gerald M. (1989). "The Sunnarti Luke". Zeitschrift für Papyrologie und Epigraphik (77): 293–96.
- Browne, Gerald M. (1994). Bibliorum sacrorum versio palaeonubiana. Louvain: Peeters.
- Edwards, David N. (2004). The Nubian Past: An Archaeology of the Sudan. New York: Routledge.
- Godlewski, Włodzimierz (2013). "Archbishop Georgios of Dongola: Socio-political Change in the Kingdom of Makuria in the Second Half of the 11th Century" (PDF). Polish Archaeology in the Mediterranean. 22: 663–77.
- Griffith, Francis L. (1909). "Some Old Nubian Christian Texts". The Journal of Theological Studies. 10 (40): 545–51. doi:10.1093/jts/os-X.40.545.
- Metzger, Bruce M. "The Christianization of Nubia and the Old Nubian Version of the New Testament". Historical and Literary Studies Pagan, Jewish and Christian. Leiden: Brill. pp. 111–22.
- Metzger, Bruce M. (2001). The Bible in Translation: Ancient and English Versions. Grand Rapids, MI: Baker Academic.
- Mojola, Aloo (2015). "Bible Translation and Christian Theological Education in Africa—A Historical and a Pan-African Overview". In Isabel Apawo Phiri; Dietrich Werner (eds.). Handbook of Theological Education in Africa. Eugene, OR: Wipf and Stock. pp. 486–99.
- Ruffini, Giovanni (2009). "Psalms 149–150: A Bilingual Greek and Old Nubian Version from Qasr Ibrim". Zeitschrift für Papyrologie und Epigraphik (168): 112–22.
- Ruffini, Giovanni (2012). Medieval Nubia: A Social and Economic History. Oxford University Press.
- Ruffini, Giovanni (2012a). "The Meinarti Phylactery Factory: Medieval Nubian Ostraka from the Island of Michael". Journal of Juristic Papyrology. 42: 273–300.
- Simons, Gary F.; Fennig, Charles D., eds. (2018). "Nobiin". Ethnologue: Languages of the World (21st ed.). Dallas, TX: SIL International.
- van Gerven Oei, Vincent W. J. (2020). "Scholarship as Biography: An Allegorical Reading of the Philological Work of G. M. Browne". In Catherine E. Karkov; Anna Kłosowska; Vincent W. J. van Gerven Oei (eds.). Disturbing Times: Medieval Pasts, Reimagined Futures. Punctum Books. pp. 29–72.
