= Caravan city =

City deriving its prosperity from a caravan route

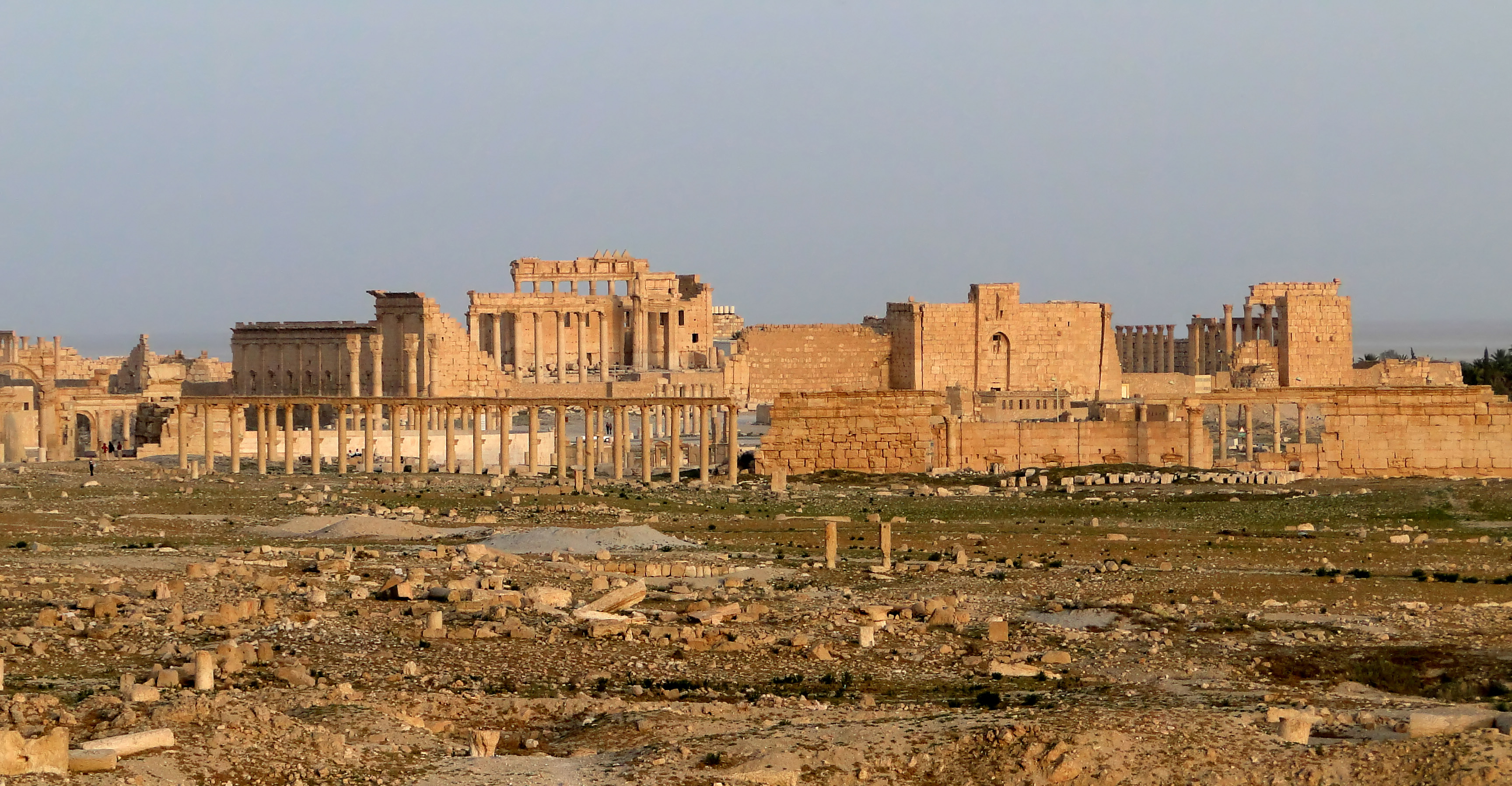
Some of the ruins of Palmyra.

Trade routes of the Western Sahara Desert c. 1000–1500. (Goldfields are indicated by light brown shading).

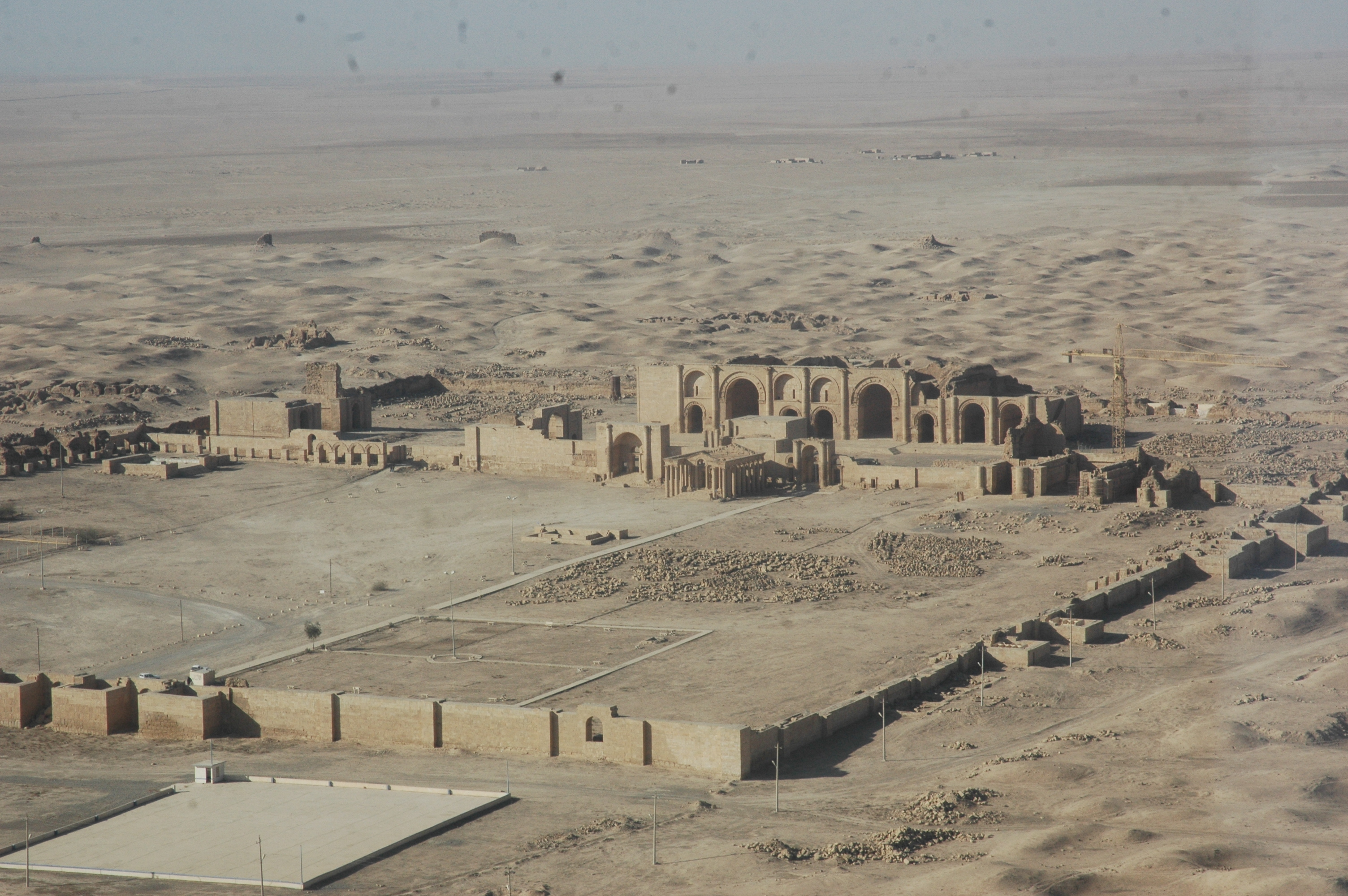
Ruins of Hatra, a caravan city that flourished in the 2nd century

A caravan city is a city located on and deriving its prosperity from its location on a major trans-desert trade route. The term is believed to have been coined by the scholar of antiquity, Michael Rostovtzeff, for his work O Blijnem Vostoke, published in English as Caravan Cities in 1932. The English translation of the work dealt principally with Petra, Jerash, Palmyra and Dura in the Near East, after Rhodes, Cyprus and Mycenaean Greece were removed from the translation as not being caravan cities. Dura, too, has been later considered to be more than a caravan city.

Other caravan cities include Aroer in Jordan, Hatra in Iraq, Oualata in Mauritania, Damascus in Syria, and Samarkand in Uzbekistan.

The caravan cities of the Near East declined as the small trade states between the Roman and Persian empires were gradually absorbed by the two, and the "wall mentality" became dominant, that is, construction of defensive systems (Roman limes and Persian defense lines) and implementation of trade through a single point, the city of Nisibis.

== See also ==
- Caravanserai
- Silk Road
