= Kenzi language =

Nubian language spoken in Egypt

Kenzi
- Mattokki
- Native to: Egypt
- Region: Nile River
- Ethnicity: Kunuz
- Native speakers: 35,000 (2023)
- Language family: Nilo-Saharan?: Eastern Sudanic; Northern Eastern; Nubian; Central; Kenzi
- Writing system: Coptic script (Old Nubian variant); Latin alphabet Arabic alphabet

Language codes
- ISO 639-3: xnz
- Glottolog: kenu1243
- ELP: Kenuzi

Kenzi, also known as Kenuzi, Kunuz, or Mattokki, is a Nubian language of Egypt. It is spoken north of Mahas in Egypt, and is closely related to Dongolawi or Andaandi, a Nubian language of Sudan. The two have historically been considered two varieties of one language. More recent research recognizes them as distinct languages without a "particularly close genetic relationship." With population displacement due to the Aswan High Dam there are communities of speakers in Lower Egypt. Recent linguistic research on the Kenzi language has been conducted by Ahmed Sokarno Abdel-Hafiz.

Kenzi is currently a threatened language that has about 35,000 native speakers worldwide. Ethnologue reports that the use of Kenzi is decreasing as the language is spoken by adults only and that all speakers are shifting to Egyptian Arabic. Most speakers of Kenzi live in the city of Kom Ombo in the Aswan Governorate of Egypt.

== Phonology ==
=== Consonants ===
		Labial	Alveolar	Palatal	Velar	Glottal
Stop	voiceless		t	c	k	
Stop	voiced	b	d	ɟ	g	
Nasal		m	n	ɲ		
Fricative		f	s	ʃ		h
Rhotic			ɾ			
Lateral			l			
Approximant		w		j		

- /s/ can be heard as voiced [z] when preceding voiced stops.
- /n/ is heard as velar [ŋ] when before velar stops. /l/ is heard as velarized [ɫ] when in the same position.

=== Vowels ===
	Front	Central	Back
Close	i iː		u uː
Mid	e eː		o oː
Open		a aː	
