= Daraw =

Daraw دراو
- City
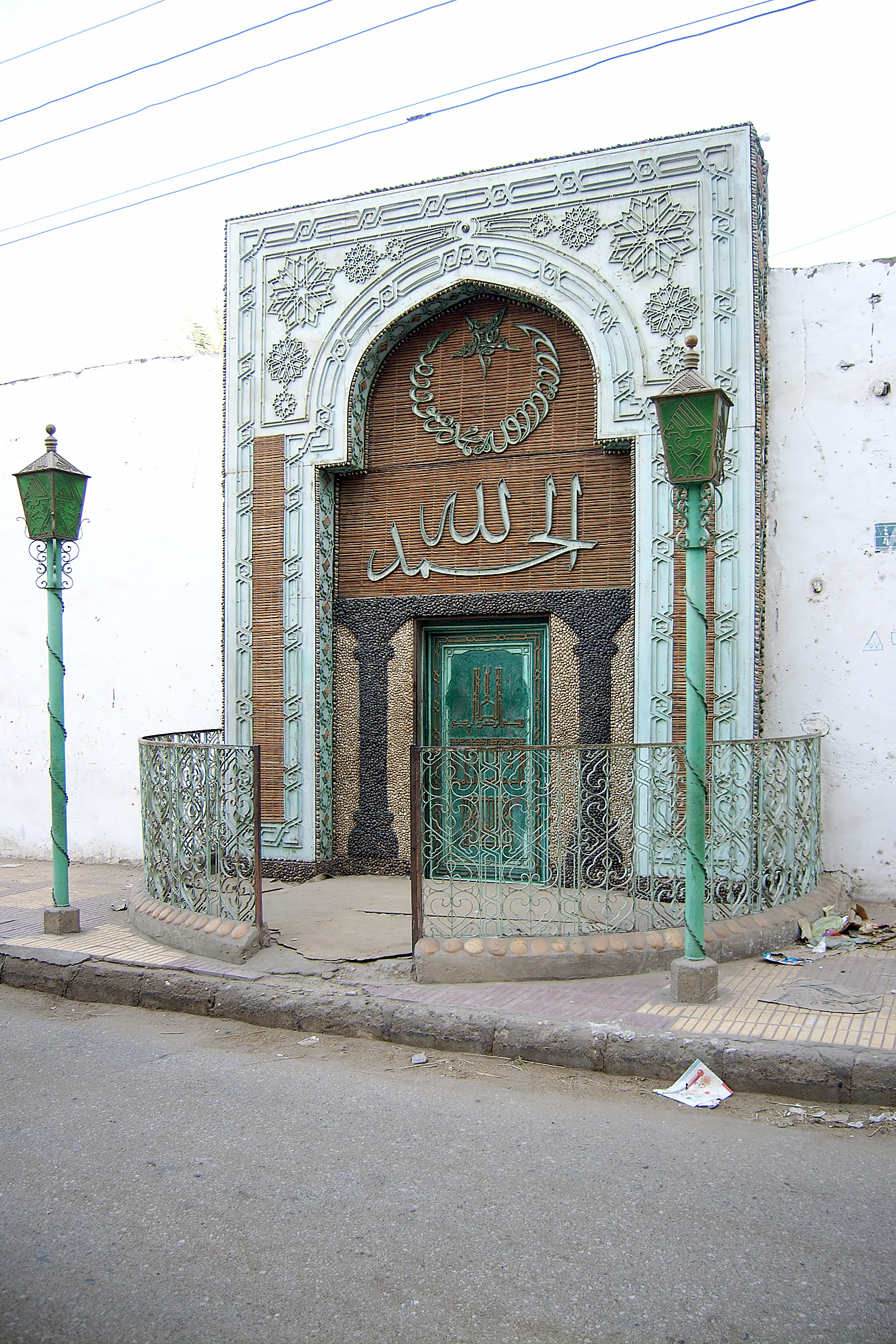

- Location in Egypt
- Coordinates: 24.4°N 32.916667°E
- Country: Egypt
- Governorate: Aswan

Area
  - Total: 590.6 km^{2} (228.0 sq mi)

Population (2023)
  - Total: 152,541
  - Density: 258.3/km^{2} (668.9/sq mi)
- Demonym(s): Darawi (Male, Arabic: دراوي) Darawiyah (Female, Arabic: دراوية)
- Time zone: UTC+2 (EET)
  - Summer (DST): UTC+3 (EEST)

Daraw (Arabic: دراو, from Akhmimic Coptic: ⲧⲁⲣⲁⲩ, lit. 'thistles') is a city in the Aswan Governorate, Egypt.

== Geography ==
It is located on the eastern bank of the Nile, six kilometers south of Kom Ombo and 38 kilometers north of the city of Aswan. Its population was 152,541 in 2023. In addition to the center, four nearby villages belong to the administrative area of Daraw. For a long time, Daraw was the most important camel market in Egypt.

== See also ==
- List of cities and towns in Egypt
