= New Aswan =

New Aswan أسوان الجديدة
- City
- Location in Egypt
- Coordinates: 24.085296°N 32.904779°E
- Country: Egypt
- Governorate: Aswan
- Founded: 1999

Area
  - Total: 16.52 km^{2} (6.38 sq mi)

Population (2021)
  - Total: 112
  - Density: 6.78/km^{2} (17.6/sq mi)
- Time zone: UTC+2 (EET)
  - Summer (DST): UTC+3 (EEST)

New Aswan (Arabic: أسوان الجديدة) is a city in the Aswan Governorate, Egypt.

== See also ==
- List of cities and towns in Egypt
