= Sebaiya =

Sebaiya السباعية
- City
- Location in Egypt
- Coordinates: 25.174961°N 32.678633°E
- Country: Egypt
- Governorate: Aswan
- Time zone: UTC+2 (EET)
  - Summer (DST): UTC+3 (EEST)

Sebaiya (Arabic: السباعية) is a city in Aswan Governorate, Egypt.

== See also ==
- List of cities and towns in Egypt
