= Old Nubian =

Extinct Nubian language of northern Sudan and southern Egypt

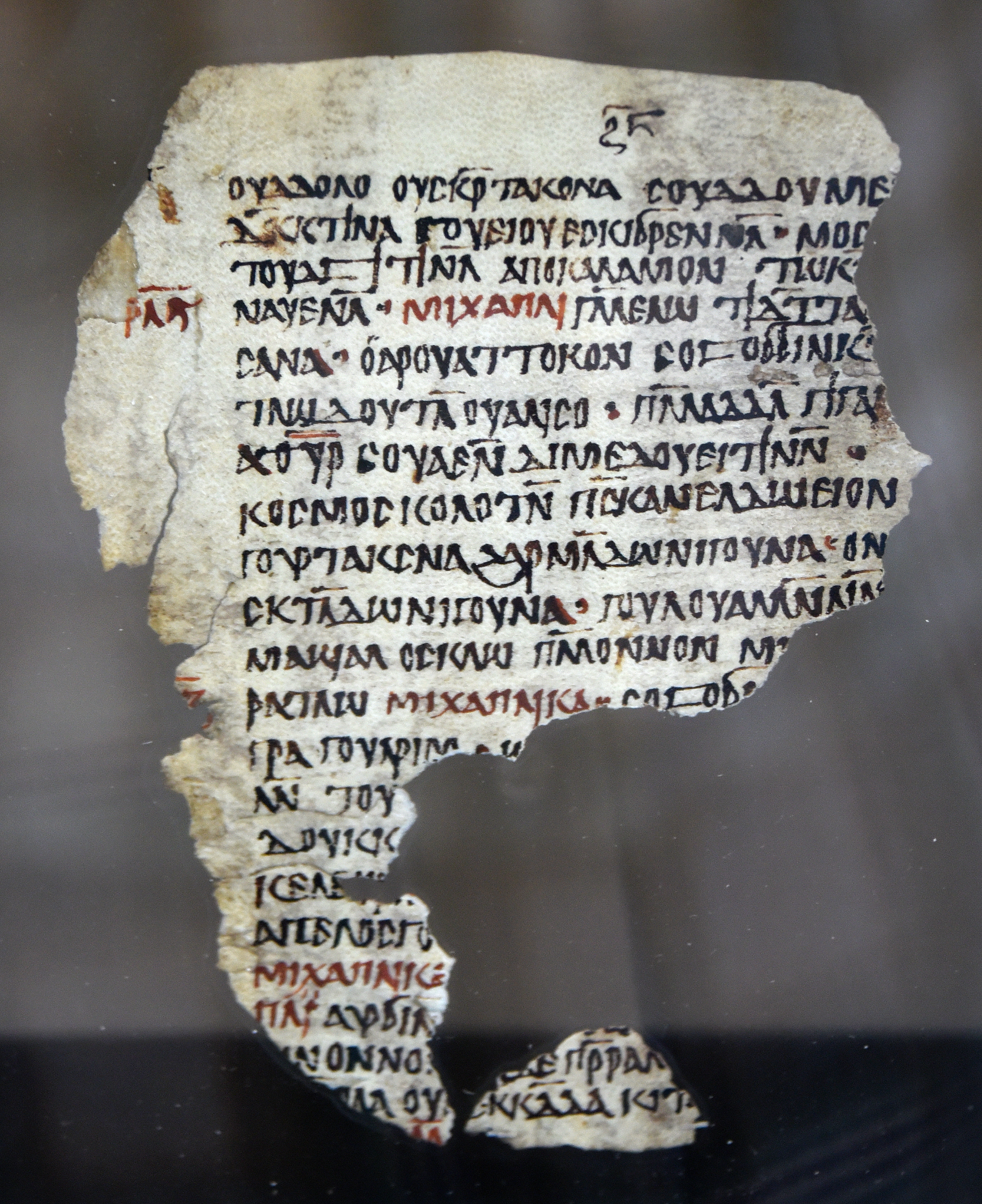
- A page from an Old Nubian translation of the Investiture of the Archangel Michael, from the 9th–10th century, found at Qasr Ibrim, now at the British Museum. Michael's name appears in red with a characteristic epenthetic -ⲓ.
- Native to: Egypt, Sudan
- Region: Along the banks of the Nile in Lower and Upper Nubia (southern Egypt and northern Sudan)
- Era: 8th–15th century; evolved into Nobiin.
- Language family: Nilo-Saharan?: Eastern Sudanic; Northern Eastern; Nubian; Old Nubian
- Writing system: Nubian

Language codes
- ISO 639-3: onw
- Glottolog: oldn1245

Old Nubian (also called Old Nobiin) is an extinct Nubian language, attested in writing from the 8th to the 15th century AD. It is ancestral to modern-day Nobiin and closely related to Dongolawi and Kenzi. It was used throughout the kingdom of Makuria, including the eparchy of Nobatia. The language is preserved in more than a hundred pages of documents and inscriptions, both of a religious nature (homilies, prayers, hagiographies, psalms, lectionaries), and related to the state and private life (legal documents, letters), written using adaptation of the Coptic alphabet.

== History ==
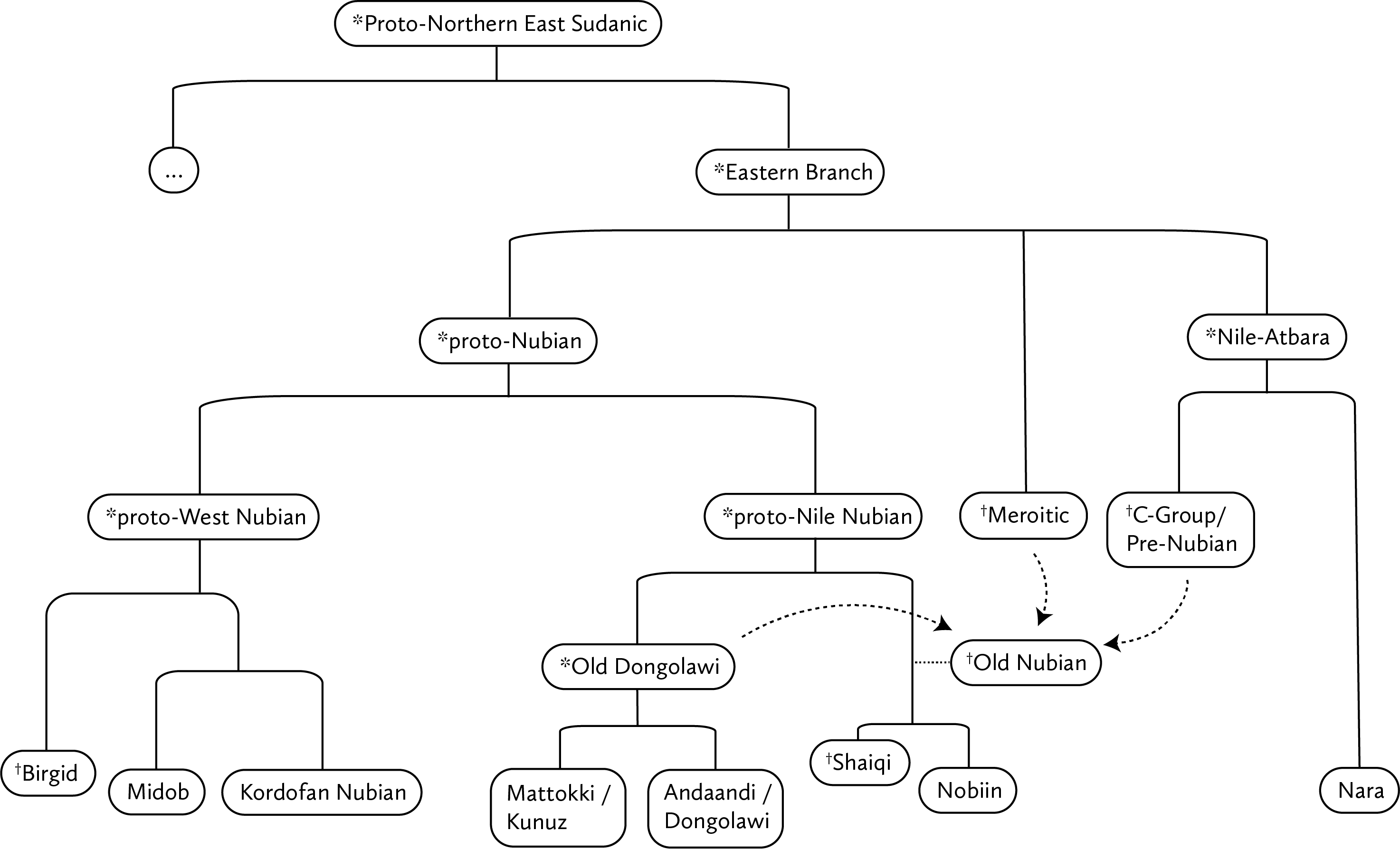
Eastern branch of the Northern East Sudanic (NES) language family, indicating the position of Old Nubian and its genealogical and areal relations with other NES languages

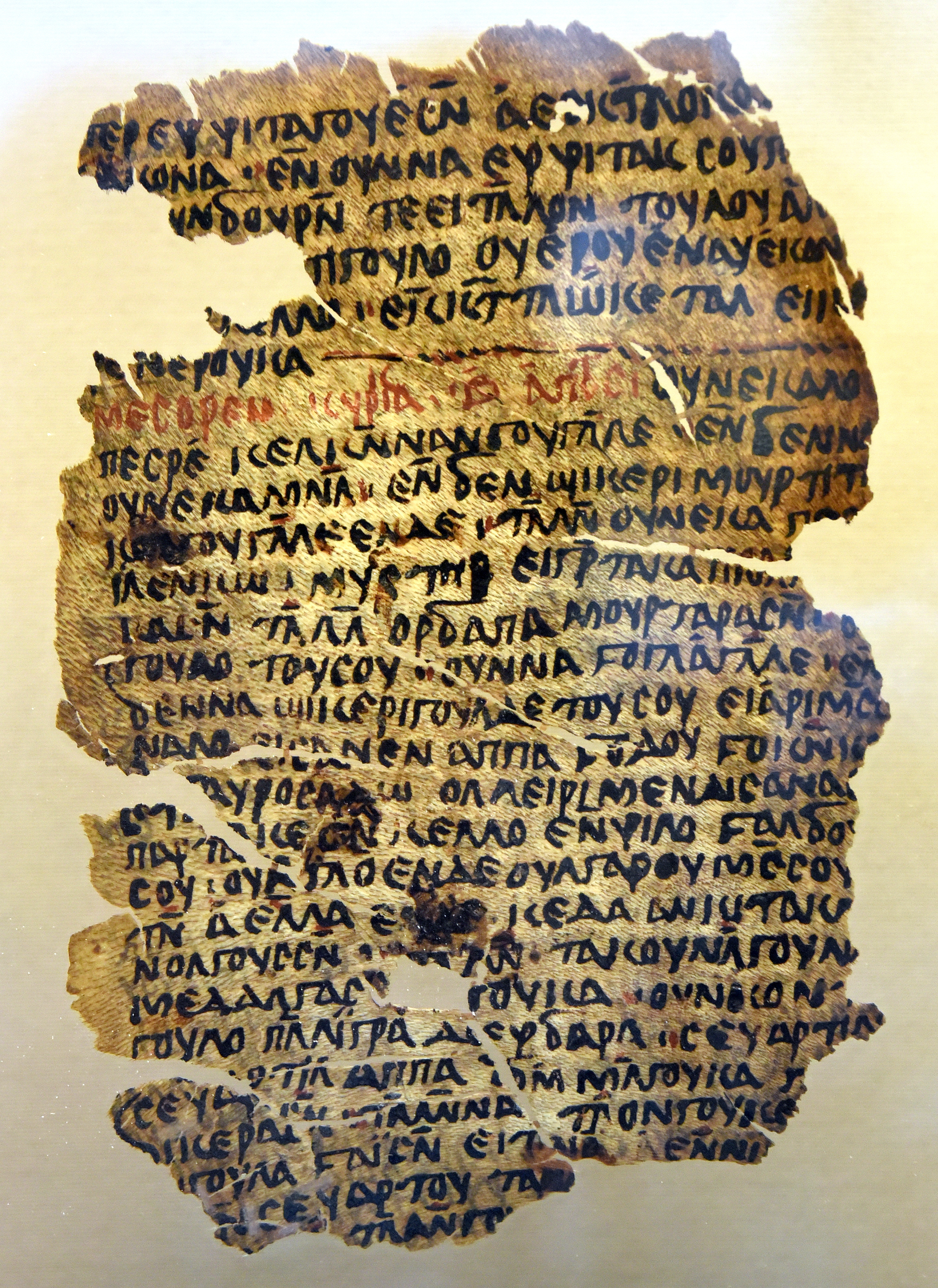
Parchment page of the Bible, part of the New Testament (Corinthians and Hebrews) in written in Old Nubian. 9th–10th century CE. From Qasr Ibrim,

Old Nubian is one of the oldest written African languages and appears to have been adopted from the 10th–11th century as the main language for the civil and religious administration of Makuria. Besides Old Nubian, Koine Greek was widely used, especially in religious contexts, while Coptic mainly predominates in funerary inscriptions. Over time, more and more Old Nubian began to appear in both secular and religious documents (including the Bible), while several grammatical aspects of Greek, including the case, agreement, gender, and tense morphology underwent significant erosion. The consecration documents found with the remains of archbishop Timotheos suggest, however, that Greek and Coptic continued to be used into the late 14th century, by which time Arabic was also in widespread use.

== Writing system ==
The script in which nearly all Old Nubian texts have been written is a slanted uncial variant of the Coptic alphabet, originating from the White Monastery in Sohag. The alphabet included three additional letters ⳡ /ɲ/ and ⳣ /w/, and ⳟ /ŋ/, the first two deriving from the Meroitic alphabet. The presence of these characters suggest that although the first written evidence of Old Nubian dates to the 8th century, the script must have already been developed in the 6th century, following the collapse of the Meroitic state. Additionally, Old Nubian used the variant ⳝ for the Coptic letter ϭ.

a ⲁ IPA: /a, aː/	b ⲃ IPA: /b/	g ⲅ IPA: /ɡ/	d ⲇ IPA: /d/	e ⲉ IPA: /e, eː/	z ⲍ IPA: /z/	ē ⲏ IPA: /i, iː/	th ⲑ IPA: /t/	i ⲓ IPA: /i/	k ⲕ IPA: /k/, /ɡ/
l ⲗ IPA: /l/	m ⲙ IPA: /m/	n ⲛ IPA: /n/	x ⲝϩ IPA: /ks/	o ⲟ IPA: /o, oː/	p ⲡ IPA: /p/	r ⲣ IPA: /ɾ/	s ⲥ IPA: /s/	t ⲧ IPA: /t/	u ⲩ IPA: /i, u/
ph ⲫ IPA: /f/	kh ⲭ IPA: /x/	ps ⲯ IPA: /ps/	ō ⲱ IPA: /o, oː/	š ϣ IPA: /ʃ/	h ϩ IPA: /h/	j ⳝ IPA: /ɟ/	ŋ ⳟ IPA: /ŋ/	ñ ⳡ IPA: /ɲ/	w ⳣ IPA: /w/

The characters ⲍ, ⲝ/ϩ ⲭ, ⲯ only appear in Greek loanwords. Gemination was indicated by writing double consonants; long vowels were usually not distinguished from short ones. Old Nubian featured two digraphs: ⲟⲩ /u, uː/ and ⲉⲓ /i, iː/. A diaeresis over ⲓ (ⲓ̈) was used to indicate the semivowel /j/. In addition, Old Nubian featured a supralinear stroke, which could indicate:

- a vowel that formed the beginning of a syllable or was preceded by ⲗ, ⲛ, ⲣ, ⳝ;
- an /i/ preceding a consonant.

Modern Nobiin is a tonal language; if Old Nubian was tonal as well, the tones were not marked.

Punctuation marks included a high dot •, sometimes substituted by a double backslash \\ (⳹), which was used roughly like an English period or colon; a slash / (⳺), which was used like a question mark; and a double slash // (⳼), which was sometimes used to separate verses.

In 2021, the first modern Nubian typeface based on the style of text written in old Nubian manuscripts called Sawarda was released designed by Hatim-Arbaab Eujayl for a series of educational books teaching Nobiin.

== Grammar ==
=== Nouns ===
Old Nubian has no gender. The noun consists of a stem to which derivational suffixes may be added. Plural markers, case markers, postpositions, and the determiner are added on the entire noun phrase, which may also comprise adjectives, possessors, and relative clauses.

==== Determination ====
Old Nubian has one definite determiner -(ⲓ)ⲗ. The precise function of this morpheme has been a matter of controversy, with some scholars proposing it as nominative case or subjective marker. Both the distribution of the morpheme and comparative evidence from Meroitic, however, point to a use as determiner.

==== Case ====
Old Nubian has a nominative-accusative case system with four structural cases determining the core arguments in the sentence, as well as a number of lexical cases for adverbial phrases.

Structural Cases	Nominative	–
Structural Cases	Accusative	-ⲕ(ⲁ)
Structural Cases	Genitive	-ⲛ(ⲁ)
Structural Cases	Dative	-ⲗⲁ
Lexical Cases	Locative	-ⲗⲟ
Lexical Cases	Allative	-ⲅⲗ̄(ⲗⲉ)
Lexical Cases	Superessive	-ⲇⲟ
Lexical Cases	Subessive	-ⲇⲟⲛ
Lexical Cases	Comitative	-ⲇⲁⲗ

==== Number ====
The most common plural marker is -ⲅⲟⲩ, which always precedes case marking. There are a few irregular plurals, such as:

ⲉⲓⲧ, pl. ⲉⲓ "man"
ⲧⲟⲧ, pl. ⲧⲟⲩⳡ "child"

Furthermore, there are traces of separate animate plural forms in -ⲣⲓ, which are textually limited to a few roots, e.g.

ⲭⲣⲓⲥⲧⲓⲁ̄ⲛⲟⲥ-ⲣⲓ-ⲅⲟⲩ "Christians"
ⲙⲟⲩⲅ-ⲣⲓ-ⲅⲟⲩ "dogs"

=== Pronouns ===
Old Nubian has several sets of pronouns and subject clitics, of which the following are the main ones:

Person	Independent Pronoun	Subject Clitic
I	ⲁⲓ̈	-ⲓ
you (sg.)	ⲉⲓⲣ	-ⲛ
he/she/it	ⲧⲁⲣ	-ⲛ
we (including you)	ⲉⲣ	-ⲟⲩ
we (excluding you)	ⲟⲩ	-ⲟⲩ
you (pl.)	ⲟⲩⲣ	-ⲟⲩ
they	ⲧⲉⲣ	-ⲁⲛ

There are two demonstrative pronouns:

ⲉⲓⲛ, pl. ⲉⲓⲛ-ⲛ̄-ⲅⲟⲩ "this"
ⲙⲁⲛ, pl. ⲙⲁⲛ-ⲛ̄-ⲅⲟⲩ "that"

Interrogative words include ⳟⲁⲉⲓ "who?"; ⲙⲛ̄ "what?"; and a series of question words based on the root ⲥ̄.

=== Verbs ===
The Old Nubian verbal system is by far the most complex part of its grammar, allowing for valency, tense, mood, aspect, person and pluractionality to be expressed on it through a variety of suffixes.

The main distinction between nominal and verbal predicates in a main clause versus a subordinate clause is indicated by the presence of the predicate marker -ⲁ. The major categories, listing from the root of the verb to the right, are as follows:

==== Valency ====
Transitive	-ⲁⲣ
Causative	-ⲅⲁⲣ
Inchoative	-ⲁⳟ
Passive	-ⲧⲁⲕ

==== Pluractionality ====
Pluractional	-ⳝ

==== Aspect ====
Perfective	-ⲉ
Habitual	-ⲕ
Intentional	-ⲁⲇ

==== Tense ====
Present	-ⲗ
Past 1	-ⲟⲗ
Past 2	-ⲥ

==== Person ====
This can be indicated by a series of subject clitics, which are obligatory only in certain grammatical contexts. They are generally absent when an overt subject is present in the clause, unless the subject has the topic marker -ⲉⲓⲟⲛ.

	independent form	agglutinated/merged with a following predicate marker -ⲁ
1st person singular	-ⲓ	-ⲉ
2nd or 3rd person singular	-ⲛ /(i)n/	-ⲛⲁ
1st or 2nd person plural	-ⲟⲩ	-ⲟ
3rd person plural	-ⲁⲛ	-ⲁⲛⲁ

== Sample text ==
ⲕⲧ̅ⲕⲁ ⲅⲉⲗⲅⲉⲗⲟ̅ⲥⲟⲩⲁⲛⲛⲟⲛ ⲓ̈ⲏ̅ⲥⲟⲩⲥⲓ ⲙⲁⳡⲁⲛ ⲧⲣⲓⲕⲁ· ⲇⲟⲗⲗⲉ ⲡⲟⲗⲅⲁⲣⲁ [ⲡⲉⲥⲥⲛⲁ·] ⲡⲁⲡⲟ ⲥ̅ⲕⲉⲗⲙ̅ⲙⲉ ⲉⲕ̅[ⲕⲁ]
kit-ka gelgel-os-ou-an-non iēsousi mañan tri-ka dolle polgar-a pes-s-n-a pap-o iskel-im-m-e eik-ka
stone-ACC roll-PFV-PST1-3PL-TOP Jesus eye.DU both-ACC high raise.CAUS-PRED speak-PST2-2/3/SG-PRED father-VOC thank-AFF-PRS-1SG.PRED you-ACC
"And when they rolled away the rock, Jesus raised his eyes high and said: Father, I thank you."

== Other sources ==
- Browne, Gerald M., (1982) Griffith's Old Nubian Lectionary. Rome / Barcelona.
- Browne, Gerald M., (1988) Old Nubian Texts from Qasr Ibrim I (with J. M. Plumley), London, UK.
- Browne, Gerald M., (1989) Old Nubian Texts from Qasr Ibrim II. London, UK.
- Browne, Gerald M., (1996) Old Nubian dictionary. Corpus scriptorum Christianorum orientalium, vol. 562. Leuven: Peeters. ISBN 90-6831-787-3.
- Browne, Gerald M., (1997) Old Nubian dictionary – appendices. Leuven: Peeters. ISBN 90-6831-925-6.
- Browne, Gerald M., (2002) A grammar of Old Nubian. Munich: LINCOM. ISBN 3-89586-893-0.
- Van Gerven Oei, Vincent W.J., (2021) A Reference Grammar of Old Nubian. Leuven: Peeters. ISBN 978-90-4294-185-4.
- Griffith, F. Ll., (1913) The Nubian Texts of the Christian Period. ADAW 8. https://archive.org/details/nubiantextsofchr00grif
- Satzinger, Helmut, (1990) Relativsatz und Thematisierung im Altnubischen. Wiener Zeitschrift für die Kunde des Morgenlandes 80, 185–205.
