= Michael Rostovtzeff =

Russian historian (1870–1952)

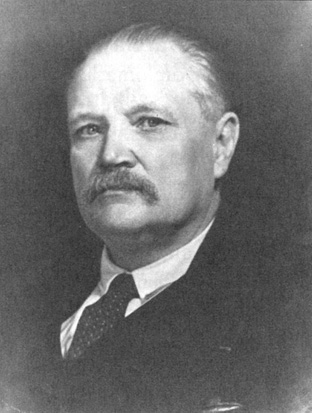
- Born: Mikhail Ivanovich Rostovtzeff; 10 November [O.S. 29 October] 1870; Zhitomir, Volhynia Governorate, Russian Empire
- Died: October 20, 1952 (aged 81); New Haven, Connecticut, U.S.
- Citizenship: United States
- Scientific career
- Fields: Archaeology, history, ancient History
- Workplaces: University of St. Petersburg; University of Wisconsin–Madison; Yale University
- Doctoral advisor: Nikodim Kondakov
- Doctoral students: Elias Joseph Bickerman; Clark Hopkins; C. Bradford Welles

Mikhail Ivanovich Rostovtzeff or Rostovtsev (Russian: Михаи́л Ива́нович Росто́вцев; 10 November [O.S. 29 October] 1870 – October 20, 1952) was a Russian historian whose career straddled the 19th and 20th centuries and who produced important works on ancient Roman and Greek history. He served as president of the American Historical Association in 1935. He was also a member of the Russian Academy of Science, the American Academy of Arts and Sciences, and the American Philosophical Society.

== Career ==
Rostovtzeff was the son of a Latin teacher. Upon completing his studies at the universities of Kiev and St. Petersburg, Rostovtsev served as an assistant and then as a full Professor of Latin at the University of St. Petersburg from 1898 to 1918. In 1918, following the Russian Revolution, he emigrated first to Sweden, then to England, and finally in 1920 to the United States. There he accepted a chair at the University of Wisconsin–Madison before moving to Yale University in 1925 where he taught until his retirement in 1944. He oversaw all archaeological activities of the latter institution in general and the excavations of Dura-Europos in particular. He is believed to have coined the term "caravan city".

While working in Russia, Rostovtzeff became an authority on the ancient history of South Russia and Ukraine. He summed up his knowledge on the subject in Iranians and Greeks in South Russia (1922) and Skythien und der Bosporus (1925). His most important archaeological findings at Yale were described in Dura-Europos and Its Art (1938).

Glen Bowersock described Rostovtzeff's views as having been largely formed by the age of thirty, developing mainly only in the quality of execution in later life, and making him "the last of the nineteenth-century ancient historians". Rostovtzeff was known as a proud and slightly overpowering man who did not fit in easily. In later life, he suffered from depression.

== The Social and Economic History of the Roman Empire ==
Rostovtzeff's notable theories, particularly on Roman Empire's collapse, were expounded in The Social and Economic History of the Roman Empire (1926). Scarred by his experience of fleeing from the Russian Revolution, he attributed the collapse of the Roman Empire to an alliance between the rural proletariat and the military in the third century A.D. Despite not being a Marxist himself, Rostovtzeff used terms such as proletariat, bourgeoisie and capitalism freely in his work and the importation of those terms into a description of the ancient world, where they did not necessarily apply, caused criticism.

Rostovtzeff's theory was quickly understood as one based on the author's own experiences and equally quickly rejected by the academic community. Bowersock later described the book as "the marriage of pre-1918 scholarly training and taste with post-1918 personal experience and reflection." At the same time, however, the detailed scholarship involved in the production of the work impressed his contemporaries and he was one of the first to merge archaeological evidence with literary sources.

== Selected publications ==
=== Articles ===
- Rostovtzeff, M. (1919). "Queen Dynamis of Bosporus". The Journal of Hellenic Studies. 39: 88–109. doi:10.2307/624874. JSTOR 624874. S2CID 163237568.
- Rostovtzeff, M. (1919). "Ancient decorative wall-painting". The Journal of Hellenic Studies. 39: 144–163. doi:10.2307/624878. JSTOR 624878. S2CID 163721898.
- Rostovtzeff, M. (1920). "The Sumerian Treasure of Astrabad". The Journal of Egyptian Archaeology. 6 (1): 4–27. doi:10.1177/030751332000600102. S2CID 192222914.
- "The Contribution of Russia to Learning". The Quarterly Review. 233: 272–287. April 1920.; reprinted in Milivoy S. Stanoyevich, ed. (1925). Slavonic Nations of Yesterday and Today: Select Readings and References on Russia, Poland, Czechoslovakia, Yugoslavia and Bulgaria. New York: The T. W. Wilson Company. p. 20-26 – via Internet Archive.

=== Books ===
- Studien zur Geschichte des römischen Kolonates. 1910.
- Античная декоративная живопись на Юге России. 2 volumes 1913/1914.
  - French translation with additional comments: La peinture décorative antique en Russie Méridionale. Paris: De Boccard, 2004.
- The Birth of the Roman Empire. 1918.
- Iranians and Greeks in South Russia. Oxford: Clarendon Press, 1922.
- A large estate in Egypt in the third century B.C. A study in economic history. Madison: University of Wisconsin, 1922.
- Skythien und der Bosporus. 1925.
- The Social and Economic History of the Roman Empire. 1926. (Revised edition in German 1931, and further revised edition in Italian 1933) (Second edition, revised by P.M. Fraser, Oxford, 1957)
- A History of the Ancient World: Volume I The Orient and Greece. Oxford: Clarendon Press, 1926.
- A History of the Ancient World: Volume II Rome. Oxford: Clarendon Press, 1927.
- Mystic Italy. New York: Henry Holt, 1927. (Brown University, the Colver lectures series)
- Caravan Cities. Oxford: Clarendon Press, 1932. (First published in book form as O Blijnem Vostoke. Paris, 1931.) (Note: The 1932 English edition was substantially revised from the 1931 first edition after the author made further trips to the Near East.)
- Dura-Europos and Its Art. 1938.
- The Social and Economic History of the Hellenistic World. Oxford: Clarendon Press, 1941. (2nd edition 1953)

=== Archival materials ===
Michael Ivanovitch Rostovtzeff Papers, David M. Rubenstein Rare Book & Manuscript Library, Duke University

Michael Ivanovich Rostovtzeff Papers (MS 1133). Manuscripts and Archives, Yale University Library.

== Citited sources ==
- Bongard-Levin, Grigory, ed. (1997). Скифский роман [Scuthial novel] (in Russian). Moskow: ROSSPEN. ISBN 5-86004-104-7.
