= Ann Ellis Hanson =

American papyrologist and historian

Ann Ellis Hanson is an American papyrologist and historian who holds the position of senior research scholar and lecturer in the Department of Classics at Yale University.

Professor Hanson received a B.A. (1957) and an M.A. (1963) from the University of Michigan, and a PhD (1971) from the University of Pennsylvania.

Her teaching career included posts at Fordham University (1968-1975), the University of Texas, the Intercollegiate Center in Rome, the Institute for Advanced Study, Princeton (1985-6), the University of Michigan, and the University of California, Berkeley. Her research contributions to classical studies lie in papyrology and in the study of ancient medicine, in both cases showing how sources outside the canon can provide new perspectives on the ancient Mediterranean.

== Awards ==
- 1992 MacArthur Fellowship

== Works ==
- "The Hippocratic Parthenos in Sickness and Health", Virginity revisited: configurations of the unpossessed body, Editors Bonnie MacLachlan, Judith Fletcher, University of Toronto Press, 2007, ISBN 978-0-8020-9013-3
- Roman Medicine, A Companion to the Roman Empire (2006), Editor David S. Potter, Blackwell Publishing, 2006
- "The Widow Babatha and the Poor Orphan Boy", Law in the documents of the Judaean desert, Editors Ranon Katzoff, David M. Schaps, BRILL, 2005, ISBN 978-90-04-11357-2
- '"Your mother nursed you with bile": anger in babies and small children', Ancient anger: perspectives from Homer to Galen, Editors Susanna Morton Braund, Glenn W. Most, Cambridge University Press, 2003, ISBN 978-0-521-82625-9
- On government and law in Roman Egypt: collected papers of Naphtali Lewis, Authors Naphtali Lewis, Editor Ann Ellis Hanson, Scholars Press, 1995, ISBN 978-0-7885-0146-3
- "Continuity and Change: Three Case Studies in Hippocratic Gynecological Therapy and Theory", Women's history and ancient history, Editor Sarah B. Pomeroy, UNC Press, 1991, ISBN 978-0-8078-4310-9
- "Medical Writers' Woman", Before sexuality: the construction of erotic experience in the ancient Greek world, Editors David M. Halperin, John J. Winkler, Froma Zeitlin, Princeton University Press, 1990, ISBN 978-0-691-00221-7
- Collectanea papyrologica: texts published in honor of H.C. Youtie, Volumes 1-2, Editor Ann Ellis Hanson, Habelt, 1976, ISBN 978-3-7749-1342-4
- Studies in the textual tradition and transmission of the gynecological treatises of the Hippocratic corpus, University of Pennsylvania, 1971
