= Klaas Worp =

Dutch papyrologist (born 1943)

Klaas Anthony Worp (1943 - 2026) was a Dutch papyrologist. He was professor of Papyrology at Leiden University between 2003 and 2008.

== Biography ==
Worp was born on 23 August 1943 in Arnhem. He obtained his PhD in Amsterdam in 1972 with a thesis titled: Einige Wiener Papyri. Between 1972 and 2005 he was assistant and later associate professor of Papyrology at the University of Amsterdam. In 2003 he became professor of papyrology at Leiden University. He succeeded Pieter Pestman. Worp retired in 2008. Upon his retirement he was not succeeded.

In 1992 he became involved in research on papyrus from the Dakhla Oasis. Worp also performed research on the collection of Ramón Roca Puig, rediscovering several words of Ancient Greek. In 2009 he published work with two others on the oldest text of the Netherlands, which dealt with a loan from Roman times.

Worp was elected a member of the Royal Netherlands Academy of Arts and Sciences in 2001. In 2008 he received a Festschrift.

== Works ==
- Einige Wiener Papyri (P.Vind.Worp), Amsterdam, 1972.
- Indices zu den Papyri bibliothecae universitatis Gissensis, Giessen, 1975.
- Fünfunddreissig Wiener Papyri (P.Vind.Tand.), Zutphen, 1976, with P.J. Sijpesteijn.
- Ostraka in Amsterdam Collections (O.Amst.), Zutphen, 1976, with R.S. Bagnall and P.J. Sijpesteijn.
- Zwei Landlisten aus dem Hermupolites (P.Herm.Landl.), Zutphen, 1978, with P.J. Sijpesteijn.
- Regnal Formulas in Byzantine Egypt (BASP Suppl. 2), Atlanta, 1979, with R.S. Bagnall.
- Die Amsterdamer Papyri (P.Amst. I), Zutphen, 1980, with R.P. Salomons, P.J. Sijpesteijn.
- Greek Ostraka: a Catalogue of the Greek Ostraka in the National Museum of Antiquities at Leiden, with a Chapter on the Greek Ostraka in the Papyrological Institute of the University of Leiden (O.Leid.), Zutphen, 1980, with R.S. Bagnall and P.J. Sijpesteijn.
- Das Aurelia Charite Archiv (P.Charite), Zutphen, 1981.
- Corpus Papyrorum Raineri VIII: Griechische Texte V, Wien, 1983, with P.J. Sijpesteijn.
- Ostraka greci del Museo Egizio del Cairo (O.Cair.), Florence, 1986, with C. Gallazzi and R. Pintaudi.
- Notarsunterschriften im Byzantinischen Ägypten (MPER N. S. XVI), Wien, 1986, with J.M. Diethart.
- Columbia Papyri VIII (P.Col. VIII), Atlanta 1990, with R.S. Bagnall and T.T. Renner.
- Corpus Papyrorum Raineri XVIIA: Griechische Texte XIIA: Die Archive der Aurelii Adelphios und Asklepiades, Wien, 1991.
- Checklist of Editions of Greek and Latin Papyri, Ostraca and Tablets, 4th ed. (BASP Suppl. 7), Atlanta, 1992, with J.F. Oates, R.S. Bagnall and W.H. Willis.
- Eine Steuerliste aus Pheretnuis (P.Pher.), Amsterdam, 1993, with P.J. Sijpesteijn.
- Greek Papyri from Kellis I (P.Kellis I), Oxford, 1995.
- Ein frühbyzantinisches Szenario für die Amtswechslung in der Sitonie (P.Pommersf.), Munich, 1996, with A.J.B. Sirks and P.J. Sijpesteijn.
- The Kellis Isocrates Codex (P.Kellis III) (Dakhleh Oasis Project Monograph 3), Oxford, 1997, with A. Rijksbaron.
- Checklist of Editions of Greek and Latin Papyri, Ostraca and Tablets, 5th ed. (BASP Suppl. 9), Atlanta, 2001, with J.F. Oates, R.S. Bagnall et al.
- The Chronological Systems of Byzantine Egypt, Leiden, 2004, with R.S. Bagnall
- Greek Ostraka from Kellis (O.Kellis) (Dakhleh Oasis Project Monograph 13), Oxford, 2004
- To the Origins of Greek Stenography (P.Monts.Roca I), Barcelona, 2006, with S. Torallas et al.
- Papyri in Memory of P. J. Sijpesteijn (P.Sijp.), Oakville, Conn., 2007, with A. J. B. Sirks.
- Back to Oegstgeest. The von Scherling Papyrus Collection. Some von Scherling Texts in Minnesota (P.Minnesota) = BASP 44, 2007, pp. 41-73, with M. Bakker and A. Bakkers.
- Berichtigungsliste der griechischen Papyrusurkunden aus Ägypten XI (BL XI), Leiden, 2009, with H.-A. Rupprecht.
- Papyri from the New York University Collection II (P.NYU II), Wiesbaden, 2010, with B. Nielsen.
- A Transportation Archive from Fourth-Century Oxyrhynchus (P.Mich. XX), Durham, 2011, with P.J. Sijpesteijn.
- Greek Papyri from Montserrat (P.Monts.Roca IV), Barcelona, 2014, with S. Torallas.
- The Bankes Ostraka from a box at Kingston Lacy: the Greek Texts (O.Bankes), Messina, 2016.
- A history of papyrology in Holland (1830–2015), Firenze, 2020.
