= Arthur Verhoogt =

Dutch historian (born 1967)

Arthur Verhoogt (born 1967) is a Dutch historian who is Professor of Papyrology and Greek at the University of Michigan.

== Early life and education ==
He was born in Alkmaar in 1967. He graduated from Leiden University with a PhD in 1997.

== Career ==
Verhoogt joined the faculty of University of Michigan in 2001. In 2005, Verhoogt published Regaling Officials in Ptolemaic Egypt. A Dramatic Reading of Official Accounts from the Menches Papers. In 2017, he published Discarded, Discovered, Collected: The University of Michigan Papyrus Collection, a full history of the university's papyri. He co-edited Papyri from Karanis: The Granary C123 (2018) with W. Graham Claytor.
