= Bruce Donovan =

Bruce Elliot Donovan (March 8, 1937 – July 11, 2011) was a U.S. academic, university administrator and leading authority on Greek papyrology. He held the titles of Professor of Classics and Associate Dean of the college at Brown University. He also served for many years as chairman of Brown's Classics Department and as president of Brown's Phi Beta Kappa chapter.

Donovan graduated from Brown University in 1959 and received his Ph.D. in classics from Yale in 1965. He served as a Woodrow Wilson Fellow, a Fulbright Scholar, and a Fellow of the Center for Hellenic Studies. His writings included Studies In The Literary Papyri Of Oxyrhynchus (1964) and Euripides Papyri (1969), as well as fifty original monographs in his field. He also was a recognized authority on Homeric fragments.

Donovan later became an authority on chemical dependency on college campuses. In 1977, he was named Brown University's first Dean of Chemical Dependency.
