= C. Bradford Welles =

American historian (1901-1969)

Charles Bradford Welles (August 9, 1901 – October 8, 1969) was an American Classicist and ancient historian, born in Old Saybrook, Connecticut. His academic career was at Yale University. He received a B.A. in 1924, a Ph.D. in 1928, became an instructor in 1927, an assistant professor in 1931, an associate professor in 1939 and professor in 1940. At his death he was professor of ancient history and curator of the Yale Collection of Papyri. He was profoundly influenced by the great ancient historian Michael I. Rostovtzeff, who arrived at Yale in 1925.

In 1934 he published his first book, Royal Correspondence in the Hellenistic Period, a collection of inscriptions with commentary still widely cited today. His major academic interests lay in Greek epigraphy, papyrology, and the history and archaeology of the Near East and Egypt in the Hellenistic and Roman periods. He was the editor of a series of volumes on the archaeological excavations at Dura-Europos and published the papyri found there. He was a founder and the first president of the American Society of Papyrologists, from which he received a Festschrift in 1966.

During World War II, he served as an Army officer, stationed in Cairo from October 1944 until August 1946; there he headed the Office of Strategic Services, Counter Espionage Section, Middle East. He had technical control of all X-2 operations in Egypt, Saudi Arabia, Palestine, Trans-Jordan, Lebanon, the Levant States, Iraq, Iran and Afghanistan. For this work, King George VI appointed him an Honorary Officer of the Order of the British Empire. He was a colonel in the Office of G-2 in the Pentagon during the Korean War.

On October 23, 1927, he married Eleanor Bogert, the daughter of George Henry Bogert, an American landscape painter, and they had two sons.
