= Gerald Michael Browne =

American classicist (1943–2004)

Gerald Michael Browne (1943 – 30 August 2004) was an American classical scholar who was professor emeritus of classics at the University of Illinois. He was a founding editor, in 1988, of the Journal of Coptic Studies. The principal biographical study of his life is an article by Vincent W.J. van Gerven Oei.

== Selected publications ==
- Documentary papyri from the Michigan collection. A.M. Hakkert, Toronto, 1970. (American Studies in Papyrology Vol. 6)
- The Papyri of the Sortes Astrampsychi. A. Hain, Meisenheim am Glan, 1974.
- Michigan Coptic texts. Papyrologica Castroctaviana, Barcelona, 1979.
- Introduction to Old Nubian. Akademie-Verlag, Berlin, 1989.
- Literary texts in Old Nubian. Verein der Förderer der Sudanforschung, Wien-Mödling, 1989.
- Old Nubian texts from Qaṣr Ibrīm. 2. Egypt Exploration Society, London, 1989.
- The old Nubian miracle of Saint Menas. Mödling, Wien, 1994.
- Old Nubian grammar. Lincom Europa, Muenchen, 2002.
