= Nobiin =

Nubian language of northern Sudan and southern Egypt

- Halfawi, Mahas
- Nòbíín Ⲛⲟⲃⲓ̄ⲛ نُـٰوبين
- Native to: Egypt, Sudan
- Region: Along the banks of the Nile in southern Egypt and northern Sudan
- Ethnicity: Nubians
- Native speakers: 690,000 (2023–2024)
- Language family: Nilo-Saharan?: Eastern Sudanic; Northern Eastern; Nubian; Northern; Nobiin
- Early forms: Proto-Nubian: Old Nubian
- Writing system: Coptic script (Old Nubian variant); Latin alphabet Arabic alphabet

Language codes
- ISO 639-3: fia
- Glottolog: nobi1240

Nobiin, also known as Halfawi, Mahas, is a Nubian language of the Nilo-Saharan language family. "Nobiin" is the genitive form of Nòòbíí ("Nubian") and literally means "(language) of the Nubians". Another term used is Noban tamen, meaning "the Nubian language".

At least 2500 years ago, the first Nubian speakers migrated into the Nile valley from the southwest. Old Nubian is thought to be ancestral to Nobiin. Nobiin is a tonal language with contrastive vowel and consonant length. The basic word order is subject–object–verb.

Nobiin is currently spoken along the banks of the Nile in Upper Egypt and northern Sudan by approximately 685,000 Nubians. It is spoken by the Fedicca in Egypt and the Mahas and Halfawi tribes in Sudan. Present-day Nobiin speakers are almost universally multilingual in local varieties of Arabic, generally speaking Modern Standard Arabic (for official purposes) as well as Saʽidi Arabic, Egyptian Arabic, or Sudanese Arabic. Many Nobiin-speaking Nubians were forced to relocate in 1963–1964 to make room for the construction of the Aswan Dam at Aswan, Egypt and for the upstream Lake Nasser.

There is no standardised orthography for Nobiin. It has been written in both Latin and Arabic scripts. Recently there have been efforts to revive the Old Nubian alphabet. This article adopts the Latin orthography used in the only published grammar of Nobiin, Roland Werner's (1987) Grammatik des Nobiin.

== Geography and demography ==
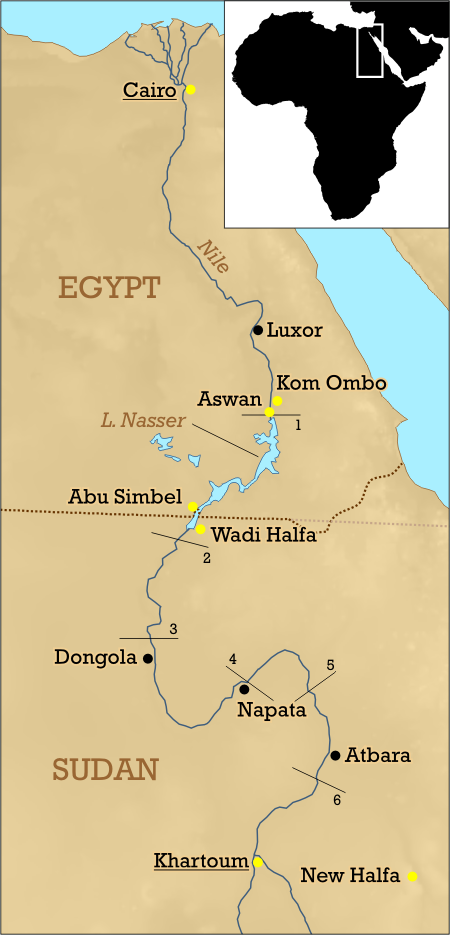
Before the construction of the Aswan Dam, the Nobiin people lived mainly between the first and third cataracts of the Nile along the shores of the Nile. Yellow dots show places where communities of Nobiin speakers are found today.

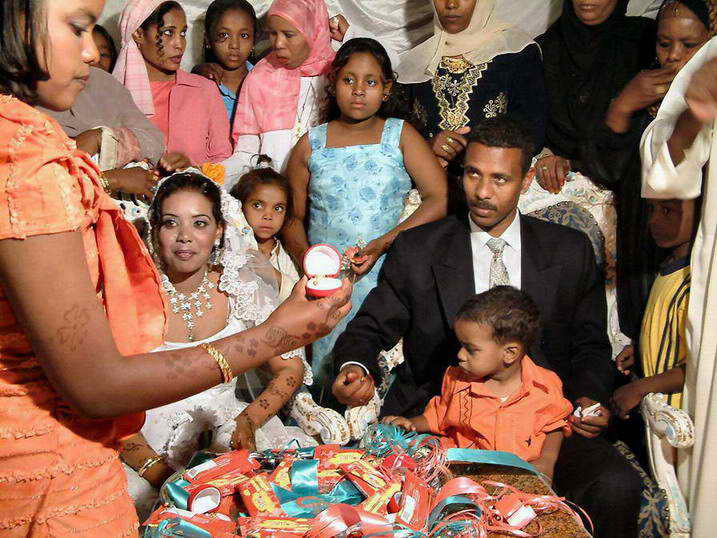
A Nubian wedding near Aswan, Egypt

Before the construction of the Aswan Dam, speakers of Nobiin lived in the Nile valley between the third cataract in the south and Korosko in the north. About 60% of the territory of Nubia was destroyed or rendered unfit for habitation as a result of the construction of the dam and the creation of Lake Nasser. At least half of the Nubian population was forcibly resettled. Nowadays, Nobiin speakers live in the following areas: (1) near Kom Ombo, Egypt, about 40 km north of Aswan, where new housing was provided by the Egyptian government for approximately 50,000 Nubians; (2) in the New Halfa Scheme in the Kassala, Sudan, where housing and work was provided by the Sudanese government for Nubians from the inundated areas around Wadi Halfa; (3) in the Northern state, Sudan, northwards from Burgeg to the Egyptian border at Wadi Halfa. Additionally, many Nubians have moved to large cities like Cairo and Khartoum. In recent years, some of the resettled Nubians have returned to their traditional territories around Abu Simbel and Wadi Halfa.

Practically all speakers of Nobiin are bilingual in Egyptian Arabic or Sudanese Arabic. For the men, this was noted as early as 1819 by the traveller Johann Ludwig Burckhardt in his Travels to Nubia. The forced resettlement in the second half of the twentieth century also brought more Nubians, especially women and children, into daily contact with Arabic. Chief factors in this development include increased mobility (and hence easy access to non-Nubian villages and cities), changes in social patterns such as women going more often to the market to sell their own products, and easy access to Arabic newspapers. In urban areas, many Nubian women go to school and are fluent in Arabic; they usually address their children in Arabic, reserving Nobiin for their husband. In response to concerns about a possible language shift to Arabic, Werner notes a very positive language attitude. Rouchdy (1992a) however notes that use of Nobiin is confined mainly to the domestic circle, as Arabic is the dominant language in trade, education, and public life. Sociolinguistically, the situation may be described as one of stable bilingualism: the dominant language (Arabic in this case), although used widely, does not easily replace the minority language since the latter is tightly connected to the Nubian identity.

Nobiin has been called Mahas(i), Mahas-Fiadidja, and Fiadicca in the past. Mahas and Fiadidja are geographical terms which correspond to two dialectal variants of Nobiin; the differences between these two dialects are negligible, and some have argued that there is no evidence of a dialectal distinction at all. Nobiin should not be confused with the Nubi language, an Arabic-based creole.

== History ==
Nobiin is one of the few languages of Africa to have a written history that can be followed over the course of more than a millennium. Old Nubian, preserved in a sizable collection of mainly early Christian manuscripts and documented in detail by Gerald M. Browne (1944–2004), is considered ancestral to Nobiin. Many manuscripts, including Nubian Biblical texts, have been unearthed in the Nile Valley, mainly between the first and fifth cataracts, testifying to a firm Nubian presence in the area during the first millennium. A dialect cluster related to Nobiin, Dongolawi, is found in the same area. The Nile-Nubian languages were the languages of the Christian Nubian kingdoms of Nobatia, Makuria and Alodia.

The other Nubian languages are found hundreds of kilometers to the southwest, in Darfur and in the Nuba Mountains of Kordofan. For a long time it was assumed that the Nubian peoples dispersed from the Nile Valley to the south, probably at the time of the downfall of the Christian kingdoms. However, comparative lexicostatistic research in the second half of the twentieth century has shown that the spread must have been in the opposite direction. Joseph Greenberg (as cited in Thelwall 1982) calculated that a split between Hill Nubian and the two Nile-Nubian languages occurred at least 2500 years ago. This is corroborated by the fact that the oral tradition of the Shaigiya tribe of the Jaali group of arabized Nile Nubians tells of coming from the southwest long ago. The speakers of Nobiin are thought to have come to the area before the speakers of the related Kenzi-Dongolawi languages (see classification below).

Since the seventh century, Nobiin has been challenged by Arabic. The economic and cultural influence of Egypt over the region was considerable, and, over the centuries, Egyptian Arabic spread south. Areas like al-Maris became almost fully Arabized. The conversion of Nubia to Islam after the fall of the Christian kingdoms further enhanced the Arabization process. In what is today Sudan, Sudanese Arabic became the main vernacular of the Funj Sultanate, with Nobiin becoming a minority tongue. In Egypt, the Nobiin speakers were also part of a largely Arabic-speaking state, but Egyptian control over the south was limited. With the Ottoman conquest of the region in the sixteenth century, official support for Arabization largely ended, as the Turkish and Circassian governments in Cairo sometimes saw Nobiin speakers as a useful ally. However, as Arabic remained a language of high importance in Sudan and especially Egypt, Nobiin continued to be under pressure, and its use became largely confined to Nubian homes.

== Classification ==
Nobiin is one of the about eleven Nubian languages. It has traditionally been grouped with the Dongolawi cluster, mainly based on the geographic proximity of the two (before the construction of the Aswan Dam, varieties of Dongolawi were spoken north and south of the Nobiin area, in Kunuz and Dongola respectively). The uniformity of this 'Nile-Nubian' branch was first called into doubt by Thelwall (1982) who argued, based on lexicostatistical evidence, that Nobiin must have split off from the other Nubian languages earlier than Dongolawi. In Thelwall's classification, Nobiin forms a "Northern" branch on its own whereas Dongolawi is considered part of Central Nubian, along with Birged (North Darfur) and the Hill Nubian languages (Nuba Mountains, Kordofan).

In recent times, research by Marianne Bechhaus-Gerst has shed more light on the relations between Nobiin and Dongolawi. The groups have been separated so long that they do not share a common identity; additionally, they differ in their traditions about their origins. The languages are clearly genetically related, but the picture is complicated by the fact that there are also indications of contact-induced language change. Nobiin appears to have had a strong influence on Dongolawi, as evidenced by similarities between the phoneme inventories as well as the occurrence of numerous borrowed grammatical morphemes. This has led some to suggest that Dongolawi in fact is "a 'hybrid' language between old Nobiin and pre-contact Dongolawi." Evidence of the reverse influence is much rarer, although there are some late loans in Nobiin which are thought to come from Dongolawi.

The Nubian languages are part of the Eastern Sudanic branch of the Nilo-Saharan languages. On the basis of a comparison with seventeen other Eastern Sudanic languages, Thelwall (1982) considers Nubian to be most closely related to Tama, a member of the Taman group, with an average lexical similarity of just 22.2 per cent.

== Phonology ==
Nobiin has open and closed syllables: ág 'mouth', één 'woman', gíí 'uncle', kám 'camel', díís 'blood'. Every syllable bears a tone. Long consonants are only found in intervocalic position, whereas long vowels can occur in initial, medial and final position. Phonotactically, there might be a weak relationship between the occurrence of consonant and vowel length: forms like dàrrìl 'climb' and dààrìl 'be present' are found, but *dàrìl (short V + short C) and *dààrrìl (long V + long C) do not exist; similarly, féyyìr 'grow' and fééyìr 'lose (a battle)' occur, but not *féyìr and *fééyyìr.

=== Vowels ===
Nobiin has a five-vowel system. The vowels /e/ and /o/ can be realized close-mid or more open-mid (as [ɛ] and [ɔ], respectively). Vowels can be long or short, e.g., jáákí 'fear' (long /aː/), jàkkàr 'fish-hook' (short /a/). However, many nouns are unstable with regard to vowel length; thus, bálé~báléé 'feast', ííg~íg 'fire', shártí~sháártí 'spear'. Diphthongs are interpreted as sequences of vowels and the glides /w/ and /j/.

Monophthongs
	Front	Central	Back
Close	i, iː		u, uː
Close-mid	e, eː		o, oː
Open		ɑ, ɑː	

=== Consonants ===
Consonant length is contrastive in Nobiin, e.g., dáwwí 'path' vs. dáwí 'kitchen'. Like vowel length, consonant length is not very stable; long consonants tend to be shortened in many cases (e.g., the Arabic loan dùkkáán 'shop' is often found as dùkáán).

Consonant phonemes
		Labial	Alveolar	Palatal	Velar	Glottal
Stops and affricates	voiceless	(p)	t	(tʃ)	k	
Stops and affricates	voiced	b	d	dʒ	ɡ	
Nasals		m	n	ɲ	ŋ	
Fricatives	voiceless	f	s	ʃ		(h)
Fricatives	voiced		(z)			
Trill			r			
Approximants			l	j	w	

The phoneme /p/ has a somewhat marginal status as it only occurs as a result of certain morphophonological processes. The voiced plosive /b/ is mainly in contrast with /f/. Originally, [z] only occurred as an allophone of /s/ before voiced consonants; however, through the influx of loanwords from Arabic it has acquired phonemic status: àzáábí 'pain'. The glottal fricative [h] occurs as an allophone of /s, t, k, f, ɡ/: síddó → híddó 'where?'; tánnátóón → tánnáhóón 'of him/her'; ày fàkàbìr → ày hàkàbìr 'I will eat'; dòllàkúkkàn → dòllàhúkkàn 'he has loved'. This process is unidirectional, i.e., /h/ will never change into one of the above consonants, and it has been termed 'consonant switching' (Konsonantenwechsel) by Werner. Only in very few words, if any, does [h] have independent phonemic status: Werner lists híssí 'voice' and hòòngìr 'braying', but it might be noted that the latter example is less convincing because of its probably onomatopoeic nature. The alveolar liquids /l/ and /r/ are in free variation as in many African languages. The approximant /w/ is a voiced labial-velar.

=== Tone ===
Nobiin is a tonal language, in which pitch is used to mark lexical contrasts. Tone also figures heavily in morphological derivation. Nobiin has two underlying tones, high and low. A falling tone occurs in certain contexts; this tone can in general be analysed as arising from a high and a low tone together.

- árré 'settlement' (high)
- nùùr 'shadow' (low)

In Nobiin, every utterance ends in a low tone. This is one of the clearest signs of the occurrence of a boundary tone, realized as a low pitch on the last syllable of any prepausal word. The examples below show how the surface tone of the high tone verb ókkír- 'cook' depends on the position of the verb. In the first sentence, the verb is not final (because the question marker -náà is appended) and thus it is realized as high. In the second sentence, the verb is at the end of the utterance, resulting in a low tone on the last syllable.

Íttírkà ókkéé-náà?
vegetables.DO cook:she.PRES-Q
Does she cook the vegetables?

Èyyò íttírkà ókkè.
yes vegetables.DO cook:she.PRES
Yes, she cooks the vegetables.

Tone plays an important role in several derivational processes. The most common situation involves the loss of the original tone pattern of the derivational base and the subsequent assignment of low tone, along with the affixation of a morpheme or word bringing its own tonal pattern (see below for examples).

For a long time, the Nile Nubian languages were thought to be non-tonal; early analyses employed terms like "stress" or "accent" to describe the phenomena now recognized as a tone system. Carl Meinhof reported that only remnants of a tone system could be found in the Nubian languages. He based this conclusion not only on his own data, but also on the observation that Old Nubian had been written without tonal marking. Based on accounts like Meinhof's, Nobiin was considered a toneless language for the first half of the twentieth century. The statements of de facto authorities like Meinhof, Diedrich Hermann Westermann, and Ida C. Ward heavily affected the next three decades of linguistic theorizing about stress and tone in Nobiin. As late as 1968, Herman Bell was the first scholar to develop an account of tone in Nobiin. Although his analysis was still hampered by the occasional confusion of accent and tone, he is credited by Roland Werner as being the first to recognize that Nobiin is a genuinely tonal language, and the first to lay down some elementary tonal rules.

== Grammar ==
=== Pronouns ===
The basic personal pronouns of Nobiin are:

- ày- I
- ìr- you (singular)
- tàr- he, she, it
- ùù- we
- úr- you (plural)
- tér- they

There are three sets of possessive pronouns. One of them is transparently derived from the set of personal pronouns plus a connexive suffix -íín. Another set is less clearly related to the simple personal pronouns; all possessive pronouns of this set bear a high tone. The third set is derived from the second set by appending the nominalizing suffix -ní.

my	àyíín	án	ànní
your	ìríín	ín	ìnní
his/her	tàríín	tán	tànní
our	ùùíín	úún	ùùní
your	úríín	únn	únní
their	téríín	ténn	ténní

Nobiin has two demonstrative pronouns: ìn 'this', denoting things nearby, and mán 'that', denoting things farther away. Both can function as the subject or the object in a sentence; in the latter case they take the object marker -gá yielding ìngà and mángá, respectively (for the object marker, see also below). The demonstrative pronoun always precedes the nouns it refers to.

ìn íd dìrbád wèèkà kúnkènò
this man hen one:OB have:3SG.PRES
'This man has a hen.'

mám búrúú nàày lè?
that girl who be.Q
'Who is that girl?'

=== Nouns ===
Nouns in Nobiin are predominantly disyllabic, although mono- and tri- or tetrasyllabic nouns are also found. Nouns can be derived from adjectives, verbs, or other nouns by appending various suffixes. In forming the plural, the tone of a noun becomes low and one of four plural markers is suffixed. Two of these are low in tone, while the other two have a high tone.

- -ìì (L): féntí → fèntìì '(sweet) dates'
- -ncìì (L): àrréé → àrèèncìì 'falls'
- -ríí (H): áádèm → ààdèmríí 'men, people'
- -gúú (H): kúrsí → kùrsìgúú 'chairs'

In most cases it is not predictable which plural suffix a noun will take. Furthermore, many nouns can take different suffixes, e.g., ág 'mouth' → àgìì/àgríí. However, nouns that have final -éé usually take Plural 2 (-ncìì), whereas disyllabic low-high nouns typically take Plural 1 (-ìì).

Gender is expressed lexically, occasionally by use of a suffix, but more often with a different noun altogether, or, in the case of animals, by use of a separate nominal element óndí 'masculine' or kàrréé 'feminine':

- íd 'man' vs. ìdéén 'woman'
- tòòd 'boy' vs. búrú 'girl'
- kàjkàrréé 'she-ass' vs. kàjnóndí 'donkey'

The pair male slave/female slave forms an interesting exception, showing gender marking through different endings of the lexeme: òsshí 'slave (m.)' vs. òsshá 'slave (f.)'. An Old Nubian equivalent which does not seem to show the gender is ooshonaeigou 'slaves'; the plural suffix -gou has a modern equivalent in -gúú (see above).

In compound nouns composed of two nouns, the tone of the first noun becomes low while the appended noun keeps its own tonal pattern.

- kàdíís 'cat' + mórrí 'wild' → kàdììs-mórrí 'wild cat'
- ìkìríí 'guest' + nóóg 'house' → ìskìrììn-nóóg 'guest room'
- tògój 'sling' + kìd 'stone' → tògòj-kìd 'sling stone'

Many compounds are found in two forms, one more lexicalized than the other. Thus, it is common to find both the coordinated noun phrase háhám ámán 'the water of the river' and the compound noun bàhàm-ámán 'river-water', distinguished by their tonal pattern.

=== Verbs ===
Verbal morphology in Nobiin is subject to numerous morphophonological processes, including syllable contraction, vowel elision, and assimilation of all sorts and directions. A distinction needs to be made between the verbal base and the morphemes that follow. The majority of verbal bases in Nobiin end in a consonant (e.g. nèèr- 'sleep', kàb- 'eat', tíg- 'follow', fìyyí- 'lie'); notable exceptions are júú- 'go' and níí- 'drink'. Verbal bases are mono- or disyllabic. The verbal base carries one of three or four tonal patterns. The main verb carries person, number, tense, and aspect information.

ày féjírkà sàllìr
I morning.prayer pray:I.PRES
'I pray the morning prayer.'

Only rarely do verbal bases occur without appended morphemes. One such case is the use of the verb júú- 'go' in a serial verb-like construction.

áríj wèèkà fà júú jáánìr
meat one:OB FUT go buy:I.PRES
'I'm going to buy a piece of meat.'

=== Syntax ===
The basic word order in a Nobiin sentence is subject–object–verb. Objects are marked by an object suffix -gá, often assimilating to the final consonant of the word (e.g., kìtááb 'book', kìtááppá 'book-OBJECT' as seen below). In a sentence containing both an indirect and a direct object, the object marker is suffixed to both.

kám íw-gà kàbì
camel corn-OB eat:he.PRES
'The camel eats corn.'

ày ìk-kà ìn kìtááp-pá tèèr
I you-OB this book-OB give:I.PRES
'I give you this book.'

Questions can be constructed in various ways in Nobiin. Constituent questions ('Type 1', questions about 'who?', 'what?', etc.) are formed by use of a set of verbal suffixes in conjunction with question words. Simple interrogative utterances ('Type 2') are formed by use of another set of verbal suffixes.

	Type 1	Type 2
I	-re/-le	-réè
you	-i	-náà
he/she	-i	-náà
we	-ro/-lo	-lóò
you (pl)	-ro/-lo	-lóò
they	-(i)nna	-(ì)nnànáà

Some of the suffixes are similar. Possible ambiguities are resolved by the context. Some examples:

mìn ámán túúl áányì?
what water in live:PRES.2/3SG.Q1
'What lives in water?'

híddó nííl mìrì?
where Nile run/flow:PRES.2/3SG.Q1
'Where does the Nile flow?'

ìr sààbúúngà jáánnáà?
you soap:OB have:2/3SG.PRES.Q2
'Do you have soap?'

sàbúúngà jáánnáà?
soap:OB have:PRES2/3SG.Q2
'do you sell soap?' / 'Does he/she sell soap?'

úr báléél árágróò?
you.PL party.at dance:PRES1/2PL.Q2
'Do you (pl.) dance at the party?'

== Writing system ==
Old Nubian, considered ancestral to Nobiin, was written in a Coptic-like script, an uncial variety of the Greek alphabet, extended with three Coptic letters — ϣ "sh" /ʃ/, ϩ "h" /h/, and ϭ "j" /dʒ/ — and three unique to Nubian: ⳡ "ny" /ɲ/ and ⳣ "w" /w/, apparently derived from the Meroitic alphabet; and ⳟ "ng" /ŋ/, thought to be a ligature of two Greek gammas.

There are three currently active proposals for the script of Nobiin (Asmaa 2004, Hashim 2004): the Arabic script, the Latin script and the Old Nubian alphabet. Since the 1950s, Latin has been used by 4 authors, Arabic by 2, and Old Nubian by 1, in the publication of various books of proverbs, dictionaries, and textbooks. For Arabic, the extended Islamic Educational, Scientific and Cultural Organization system may be used to indicate vowels and consonants not found in Arabic itself.

More recent educational material implements the teaching and using of the Nubian alphabet.

Old Nubian alphabet
Character	ⲁ	ⲃ	ⲅ	ⲇ	ⲉ	ⲍ	ⲓ	ⲓ̈	ⲕ	ⲗ	ⲙ	ⲛ	ⲟ
Phonetic value	a, aː	b	ɡ	d	e, eː	z	i, iː	j	k	l	m	n	o
Character	ⲡ	ⲣ	ⲥ	ⲧ	ⳣ, ⲟⲩ	ⲫ	ⲱ	ϩ	ⳝ	ⲇⳝ	ⲧⳝ	ⳟ	ⳡ
Phonetic value	p	r	s	t	u, uː	f	oː	h	ʃ	dʒ	tʃ	ŋ	ɲ

== Notes and references ==
=== References ===
- Abdel-Hafiz, Ahmed S. (2009). A Reference Grammar of Kunuz Nubian. Saarbrücken: VDM.
- Adams, William Y. (1977). Nubia, Corridor to Africa. London: Allen Lane.
- Adams, William Y. (1982). "The coming of Nubian speakers to the Nile Valley". In Ehret, C.; Posnansky, M. (eds.). The Archeological and Linguistic Reconstruction of African History. pp. 11–38.
- Ahmed, Asmaa Mohd. Ibrahim (2004). "Suggestions for Writing Modern Nubian Languages". Occasional Papers in the Study of Sudanese Languages. 9. Entebbe: SIL Sudan: 185–213.
- Bechhaus-Gerst, Marianne (1996). Sprachwandel durch Sprachkontakt am Beispiel des Nubischen im Niltal. Möglichkeiten und Grenzen einer diachronen Soziolinguistik (in German). Köln: Rüdiger Köppe.
- Bell, Herman (1974). "Dialect in Nobíin Nubian". In Abdalla, Abd el-Gadir Mohmoud (ed.). Studies in Ancient Languages of the Sudan. Khartoum. pp. 109–122.
- Bell, Herman (2000). A survey of Nubian Place-Names (PDF) (Report). Working Paper. Vol. 19. United Nations Group of Experts on Geographical Names.
- Browne, Gerald M. (2002). A grammar of Old Nubian. Munich: LINCOM. ISBN 3-89586-893-0.
- Burckhardt, Johann Ludwig (or John Lewis) (1819). Travels in Nubia. London. Archived from the original on 2008-09-11.
- Hāshim, Muḥammad Jalāl Aḥmad (2004). "Competing Orthographies for Writing Nobiin Nubian". Occasional Papers in the Study of Sudanese Languages. 9. Entebbe: SIL Sudan: 215–248.
- Heine, Bernd; Kuteva, Tania (2001). "Converge and divergence in the development of African languages". In Aikhenvald; Dixon (eds.). Areal Diffusion and Genetic Inheritance: Problems in Comparative Linguistics. pp. 393–411.
- Lepsius, R. (1880). Nubische Grammatik. Mit einer Einleitung über die Völker und Sprachen Afrikas (in German). Berlin.
- Rouchdy, Aleya (1992a). "'Persistence' or 'tip' in Egyptian Nubian". In Dorian, Nancy (ed.). Investigating Obsolescence: Studies in Language Contraction and Death. Cambridge: Cambridge University Press. pp. 91–102. doi:10.1017/CBO9780511620997.010. ISBN 978-0-521-32405-2.
- Rouchdy, Aleya (1992b). "Urban and non-urban Egyptian Nubian: is there a reduction in language skill?". In Dorian, Nancy (ed.). Investigating Obsolescence: Studies in Language Contraction and Death. Cambridge: Cambridge University Press. pp. 259–266. doi:10.1017/CBO9780511620997.021. ISBN 978-0-521-32405-2.
- Thelwall, Robin (1978). "Lexicostatistical relations between Nubian, Daju and Dinka". Études nubiennes: colloque de Chantilly, 2–6 juillet 1975. pp. 265–286.
- Thelwall, Robin (1982). "Linguistic Aspects of Greater Nubian History". In Ehret, C.; Posnansky, M. (eds.). The Archeological and Linguistic Reconstruction of African History. pp. 39–56. Archived from the original on 2005-04-03.
- Werner, Roland (1987). Grammatik des Nobiin (Nilnubisch). Nilo-Saharan Studies. Vol. 1. Hamburg: Helmut Buske. ISBN 3-87118-851-4.
- Westermann, Diedrich Hermann; Ward, Ida (1933). Practical Phonetics for Students of African Languages. Oxford University Press for the International African Institute.
