= H.U.N.E. =

Archaeological expedition in Sudan

The Humboldt University Nubian Expedition, or H.U.N.E. was one of a group of international archaeological expeditions launched in response to a 2003 appeal by the National Corporation for Antiquities and Museums (NCAM) of the Republic of Sudan. The project ran from 2004-2007.

A number of archaeological sites were at risk of inundation by the 170 square kilometres (66 sq mi) reservoir expected to result from the planned construction of the Hamdab High Dam near Merowe in the Fourth Cataract region of northern Sudan.

H.U.N.E. joined the Merowe Dam Archaeological Salvage Project (MDASP). H.U.N.E. was based at the Institute of Northeast African Archaeology and Cultural Studies at the Humboldt University of Berlin, Germany. Its main aim was the complete recording of all archaeological sites, including rock art sites, in its concession area by intensive foot surveys and the excavation of chosen representative sites of each archaeological period. The H.U.N.E. concession area comprised the islands of Us, Sur and Sherari. It also included the island of Shiri and a stretch on the left bank of the Nile (from Gebel Musa to the market village of Salamat).

Results of the first two campaigns in the years 2004 and 2005 comprised the discovery of more than 700 archaeological sites and the excavation of a Neolithic settlement site, burials of the Kerma period, and two churches of the Christian era. Apart from rescuing the archaeological sites, H.U.N.E. also undertook efforts to document the traditions and customs of the local inhabitants of the Dar al-Manasir region, which belong to the Manasir tribe. Their material culture, economic life and poetry were recorded as well.

A later project, Sur Island Leatherwork planned to analyse material found during the H.U.N.E. expedition.
