= Ibrahim 'Ali Salman =

Poet of the Manasir people in Northern Sudan

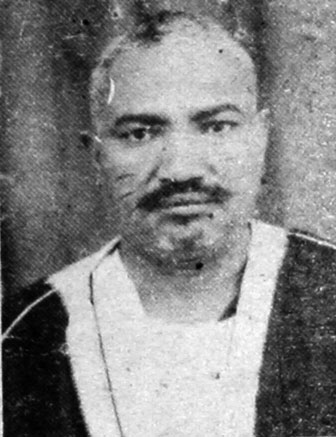
Ibrahim 'Ali Salman (إبراهيم علي سلمان), poet of the Manasir

Ibrahim 'Ali Salman (Arabic: إبراهيم علي سلمان) (1937 – March 30, 1995) is the most famous contemporary poet of the Arab Manasir who inhabit the area of the Fourth Cataract of the Nile in Northern Sudan. He is referred to by the Manasir simply as "Ibrahim the poet" (إبراهيم الشاعر).

Ibrahim 'Ali Salman was born in 1937 as the youngest son of his father "The poet 'Ali" (al-Sha'ir 'Ali, الشاعر علي). The poetry about his homeland Dar al-Manasir and the ongoing issue of the relocation of his tribe as a result of the Merowe Dam project is written in the Colloquial Arab language of the Manasir.

The poems of Ibrahim al-Sha'ir had been collected and compiled by his former student al-Nadhir Tag al-Sirr al-Bashir (النذير تاج السر البشير). The compilation comprises his life's work and is called "The Genius Diwan of the Manasir" (ديوان عبقرية المناصير). It probably is the only literary document from within Dar al-Manasir.
