= Material culture of the Manasir =

The material culture of the Manasir is very basic and primarily relies on the by-products of palm tree cultivation (cf. Date cultivation in Dar al-Manasir). Date trees not only constitute the main source of income and an important supply of nutrition in Dar al-Manasir, but the Manasir also make intelligent use of all different parts of the palm tree. From it they produce diverse household items, garden tools and building material for their traditional mud houses. (cf. Architecture in Dar al-Manasir).

What follows is a list of raw materials gathered from the date palm and the products that can be manufactured from them.

== Garidah (جريدة) ==
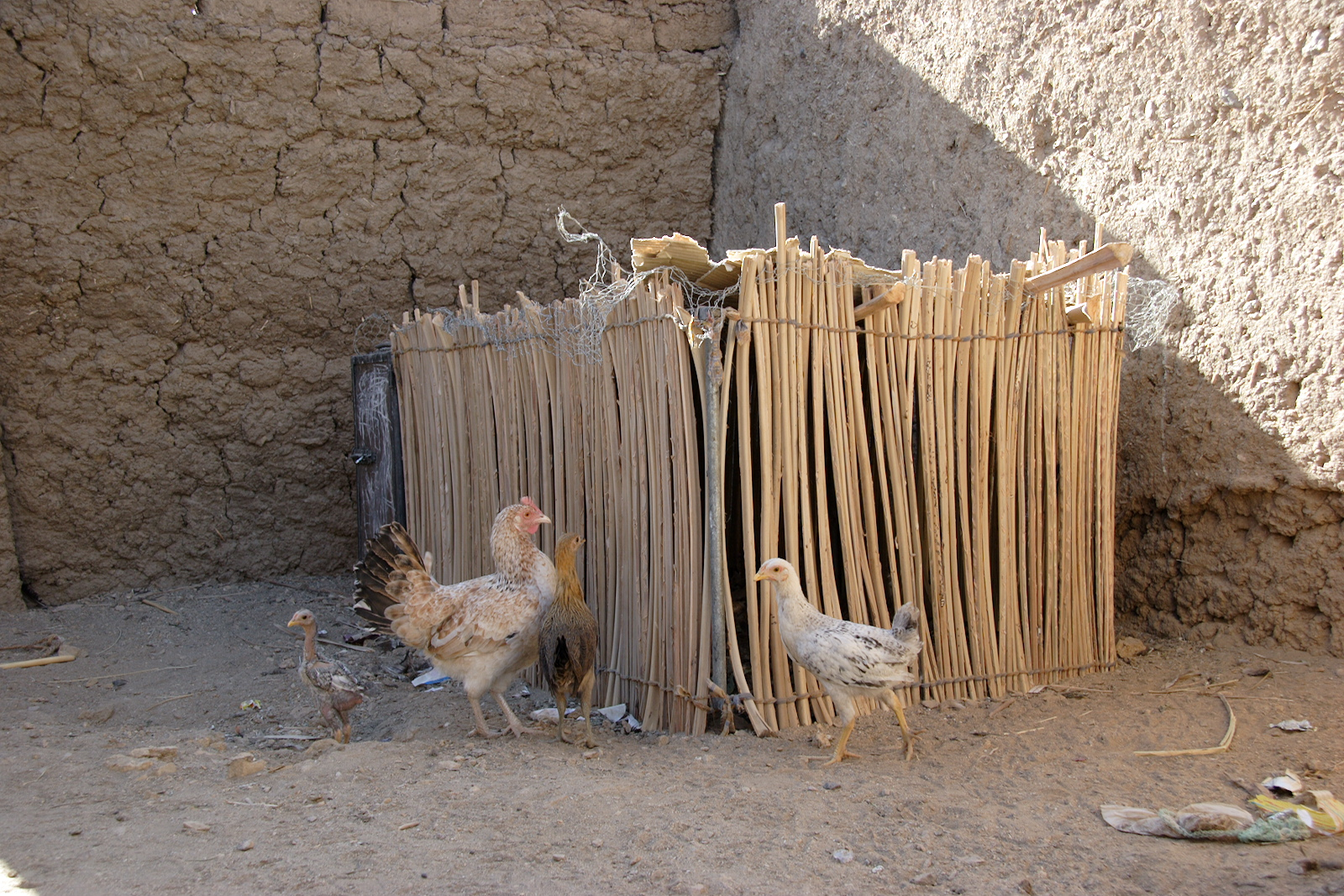
Qafas (قفص)

Garidah is the midrib part of the palm leaf. In order to be used as a raw material the Garidah is stripped of its leaflets and spikes and its broad petiole is removed. Garidat are an esteemed raw material for the production of robust containers and furniture.

The Manasir use it to manufacture small boxes (Sunduq, صندوق) in which they carry vegetables to the weekly market at Suq Salamat (سوق سلمات).
Additionally, Garidah is a good fencing material used for making small hutches called Qafas (قفص) to protect the chicken against wild animals. The Manasir also use it as roofing material to thatch their traditional mud houses (Galus, جالوص).

== Sa'fah (سعفة) ==
Sa'fat are the leaflets of palm leaves and the most important raw material for a variety of household items including baskets for use in gardening.

Household items of particular cultural and practical significance are woven mats called Burush (sing. Birsh, برش).
Mats that are called Segagah (سجاجة) are two ells wide and are laid out on the traditional beds called 'Anqarib (عنقريب). A plain uncoloured Segagah is kept aside in every household to be used for washing and carrying the body of a deceased.
A second type of Segagah is dyed in different colours and laid out by the bride groom during bridal night and further marriage festivities. It is reused for the period of forty days (ربع) after a woman has given birth and during which she is not supposed to leave the house.

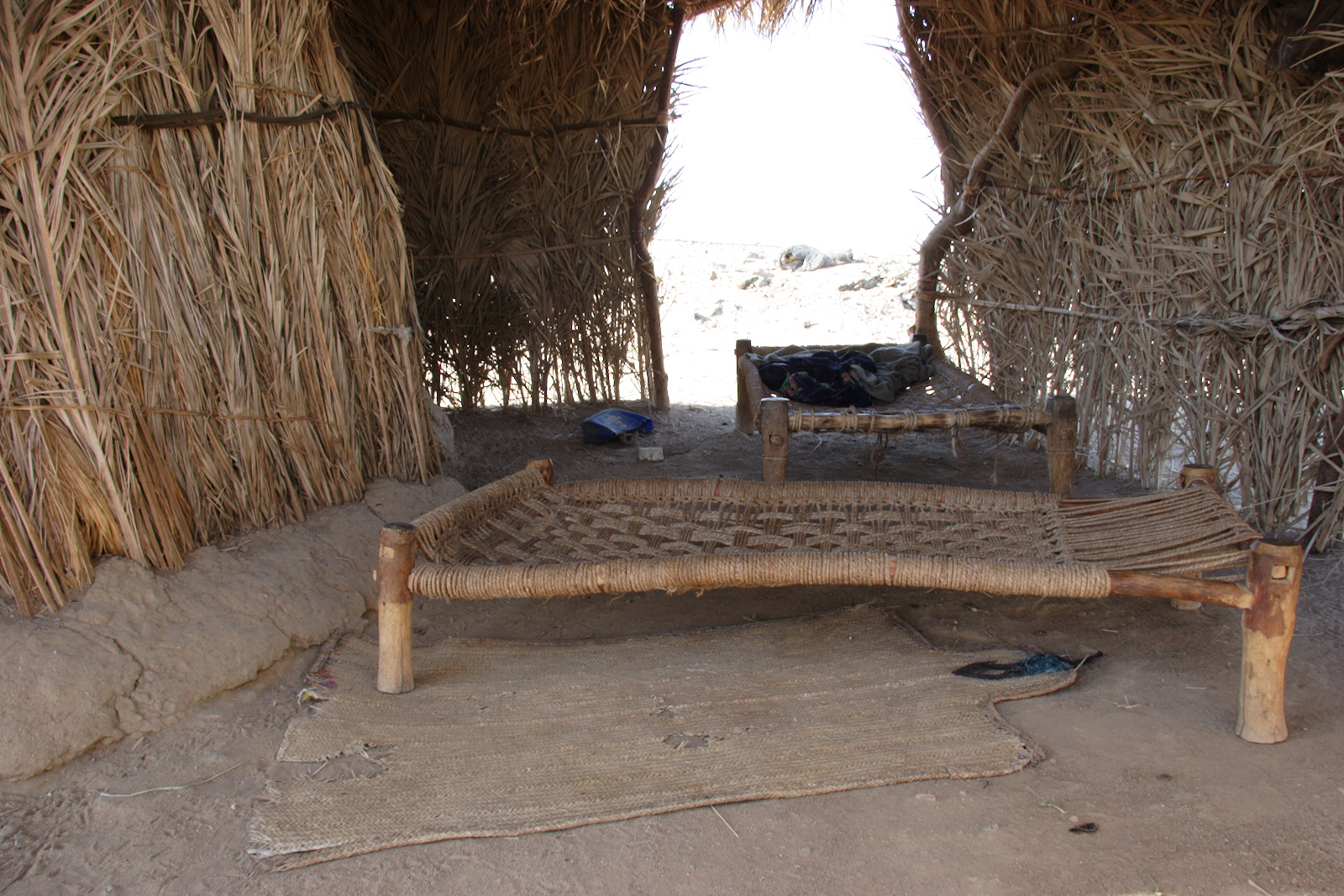
'Anqarib (عنقريب) and Birsh Ruba'i (برش رباعي)

A different kind of Birsh can be found in many households and in community places such as the guest house (Madeifah, مضيفة) of the village. It is four ells long and will be rolled out on the floor during banquets or for prayers. It is called Birsh Ruba'i (برش رباعي). The best Burush are woven from the leaves of Mishriq palm trees prominent for their soft and flexible leaflets, although leaflets of other varieties are added for higher durability (cf. Date cultivation in Dar al-Manasir). Old Burush are reused for mending holes in the ceiling or for supporting small window openings in the rooms.

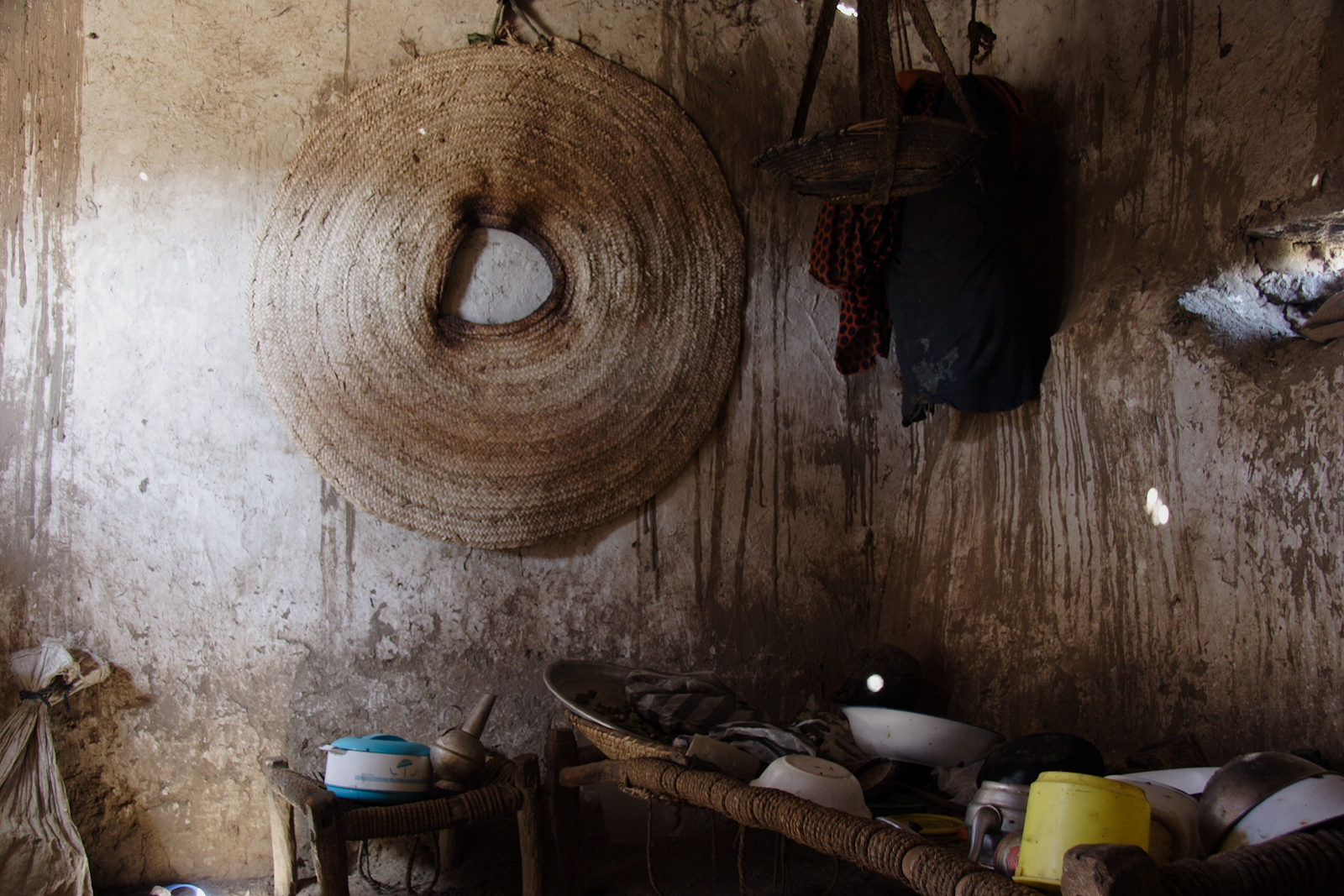
Nutu' (نطع) hanging on the kitchen wall

Another very specific mat has a circular shape with a central hole the size of a head. It is called Nutu' (نطع).

Once a week most Manasir women apply a "smoke mask" called Dukhan (دخّان) to their face and body. They burn the wood of Acacia seyal (Talh; طلح) in the kitchen hearth or a buried earthen pot in the courtyard. When the burning wood starts to produce smoke the woman will place herself on the Nutu' above the hole, covered by a big piece of coarse fabric and fumigate parts of her body until the upper skin peels off. As a result of this weekly procedure the colour of her skin will appear more pale (cf. CROWFOOT 1918:127-128). The Dukhan can also be used for medical purposes burning additional wood of Acacia ehrenbergiana (Salam; سلم) and Balanites aegyptiaca (Higlig; حجليج).

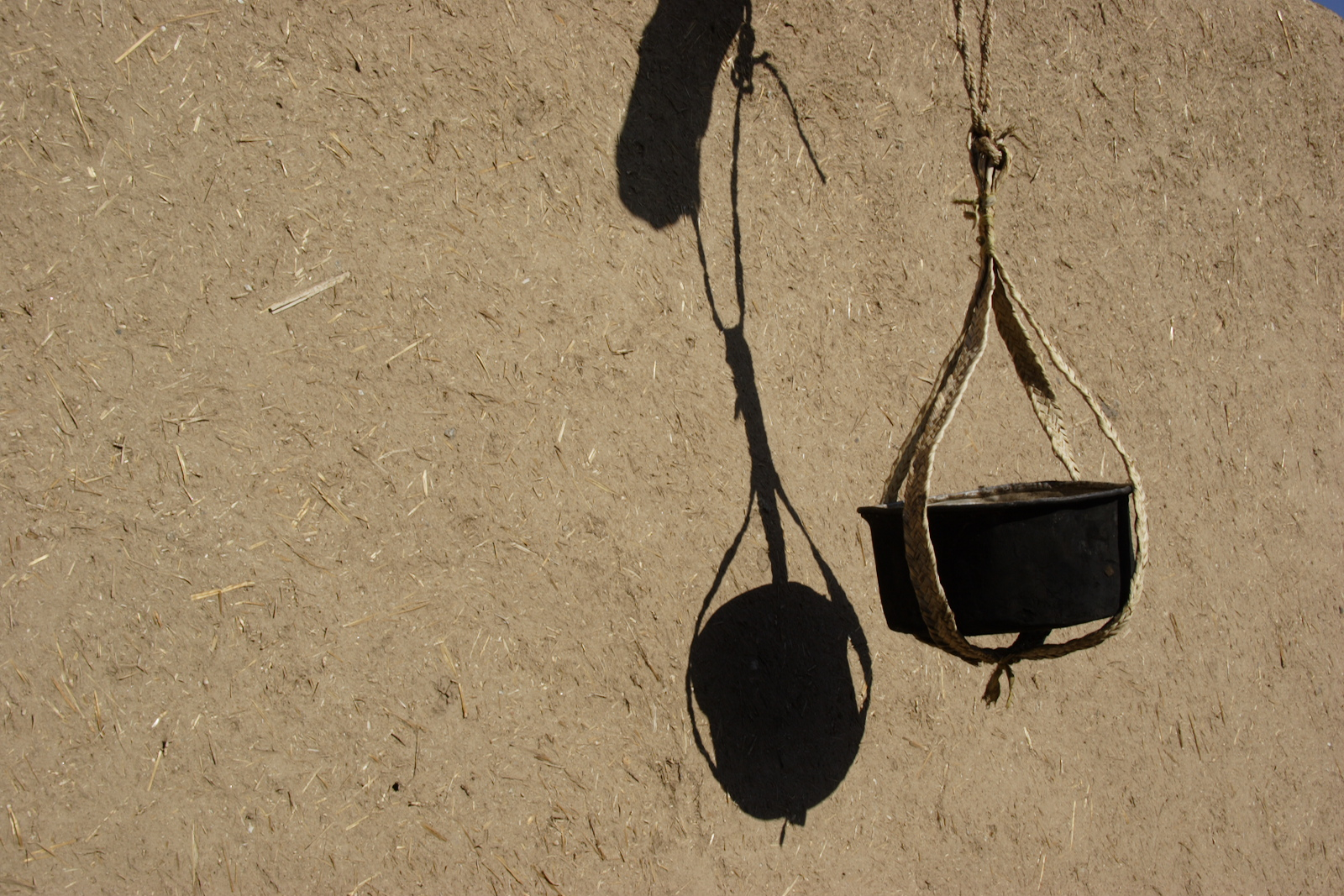
Mi'laq (معلاق) hanging from a beam

One very common household item made from palm leaflets is the Mi'laq (معلاق), also called Mishle'ib (مشلعيب).
It is a simple loop big enough to hold a food container. It is made from two crossed straps of plaited palm leaflets. The Mi'laq is hanging freely from the ceiling, from wooden beams in the courtyard or in doorways. It is a simple and effective local utensil to protect small quantities of food from animals.

Another storage device made from palm leaflets is the Shedifah (شدفة), a tightly plaited container for storing sorghum (Dhurah or 'Ayish, ذرة or عيّش).

For their work on the fields the Manasir generally rely on a minimum of equipment. The most important and much diversified objects are baskets made from palm leaflets. A multitude of different sizes with somehow similar shapes are in use, each type of basket meant for certain materials to be carried in.
The Quffah (قفّة) is the most common basket and used for carrying dates and clothes.
The Kunshibr (كونشبر) is a slightly smaller basket in which earth (Turab, تراب) and manure (Maruq; ماروق) are transported (cf. NICHOLLS 1918:24). A proper builder and cultivator (Turbal, تربال – both working with mud and therefore not further distinguished by the Manasir) is expected to employ his own Kunshibr.

The Ghutaiah (غتاية) is another very common small basket used to carry dates and seeds. Its size is exactly defined, since this basket is used as a local measurement for sorghum. Ghutaiat are exceptionally tightly plaited from leaflets of Gau palm trees (cf. Date cultivation in Dar al-Manasir).
The Saqataiah (سقتاية) is a multipurpose basket, its size in-between a Quffah and a Ghutaiah (سقتاية لاها قفّة ولاها غتاية).

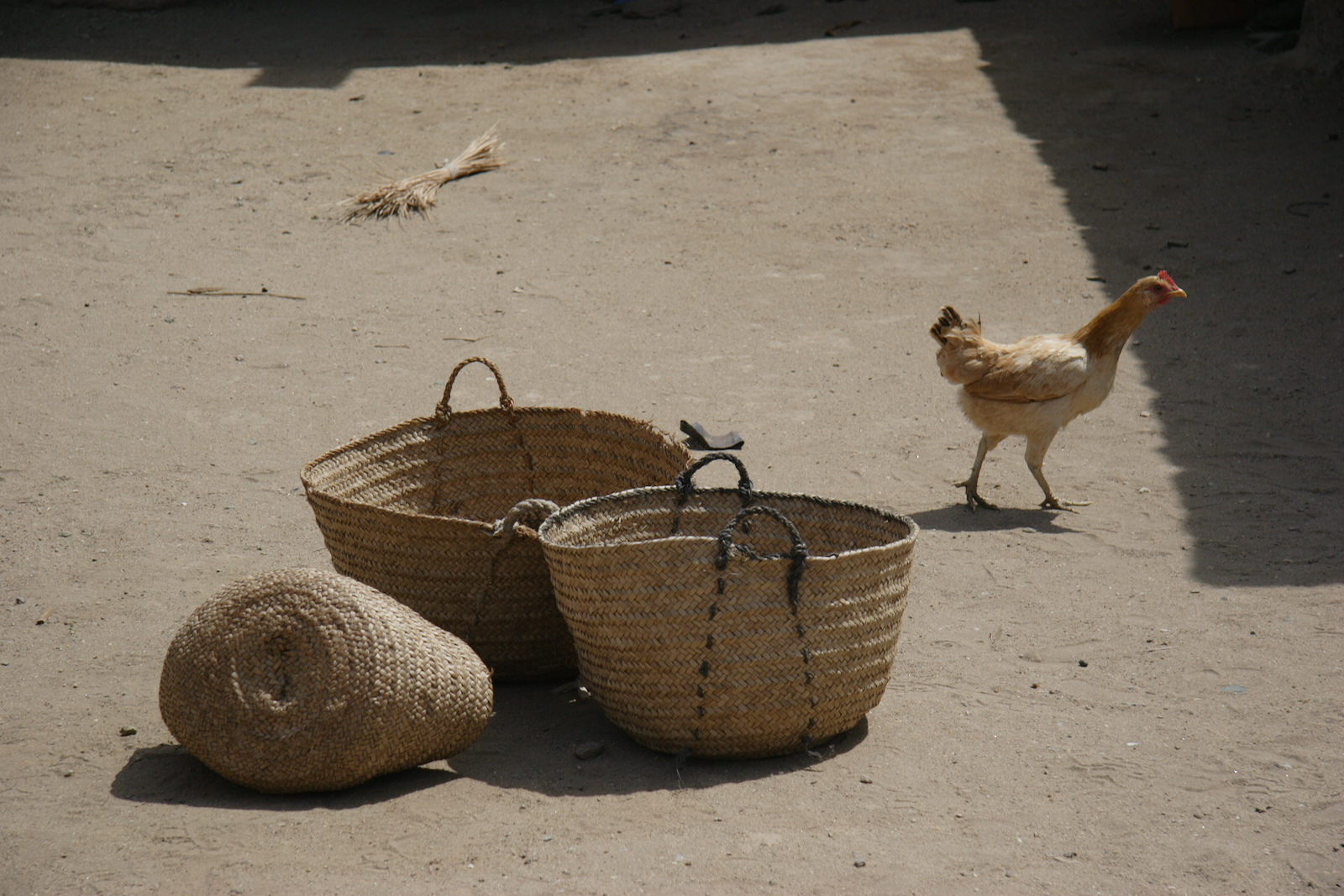
Quffah (قفّة), Kunshibr (كونشبر) and Ghutaiah (غتاية)

Special baskets are used for mounting on animals. The Bedouin Manasir have large containers for transporting sorghum on the back of camels called Qalibah (قليبة).

A very particular funnellike basket is the Rahal (رحل). It is always used in pairs, attached to the sides of a donkey by placing a transverse wooden stick through their handles. Rahal are used to carry manure, mud or dates. The lower end of the funnel consists of a narrow hole (about 10 cm wide) that is plugged with a piece of cloth or Lif (ليف). In order to unload the cargo the plug is simply pulled out from below. Nowadays Rahal are mostly substituted by a combined pair of reworked plastic sacks of wheat.

Other items plaited from palm leaflets are the Tabaq (طبق), a flat tray for winnowing wheat and sorghum during the threshing process and a small fan called Hebabah (هبابة), for heating the coal during the preparation of the traditional coffee (Gabenah, جبنة).

== Lif (ليف) or Ashmiq (أشميق) ==
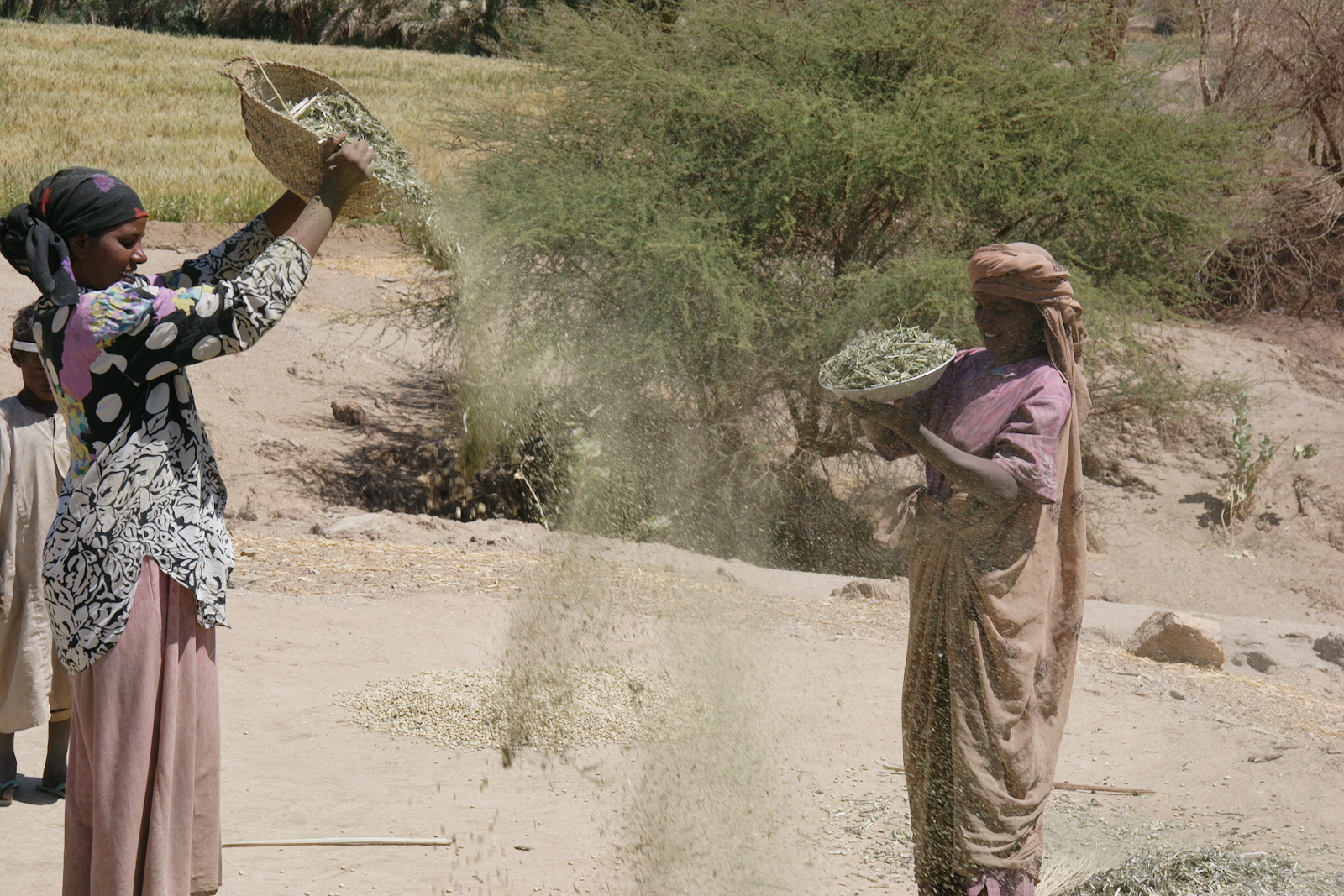
Tabaq (طبق) used for winnowing Egyptian beans (فول مصري)

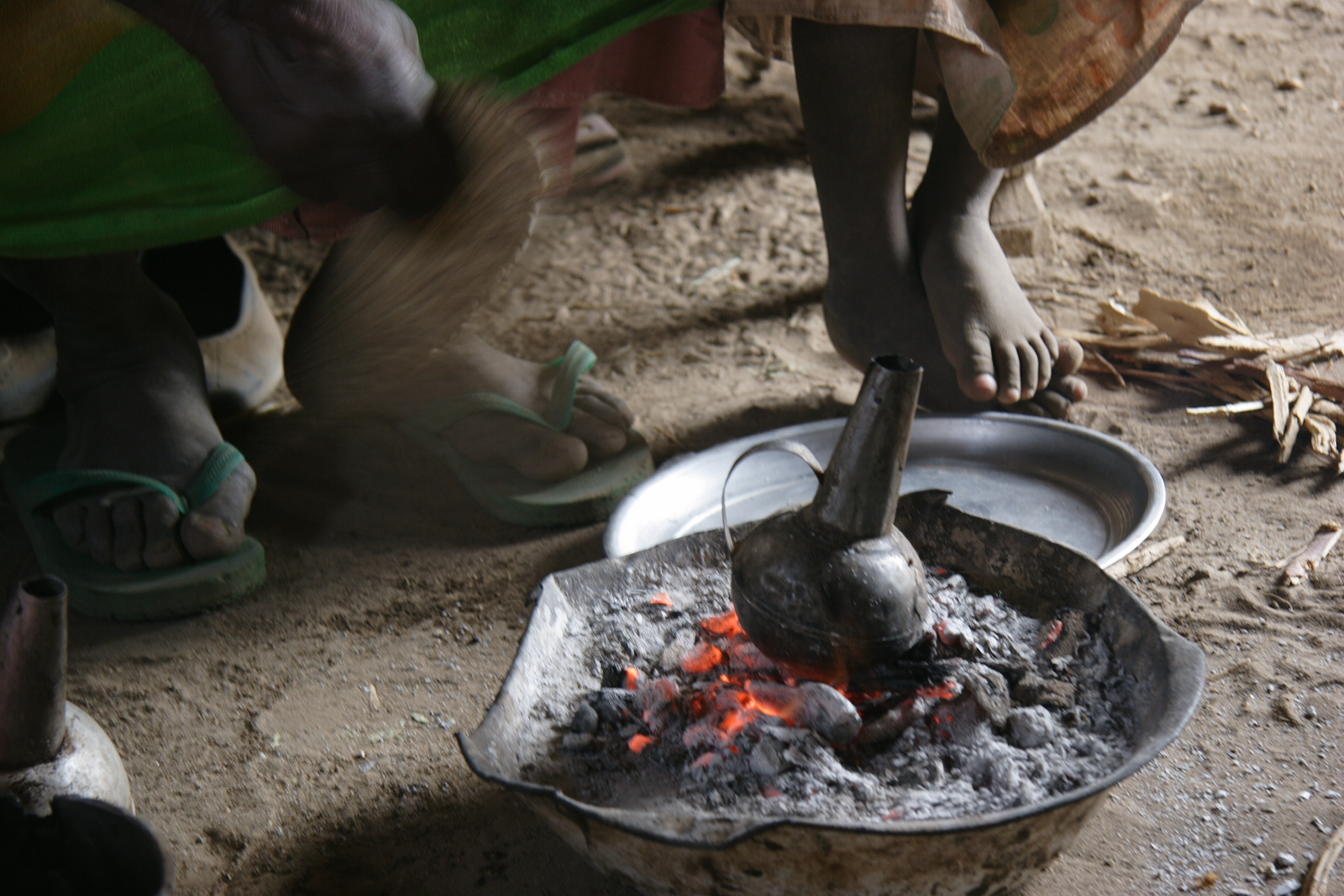
Hebabah (هبابة) used to fan the coal underneath the Gabenah (جبنة)

The connective tissue between young fronds, which eventually develops into a dried brown vascular bundle of rough fibre, attached to the lower edges of the midribs ensheathing the trunk, makes up a very durable tough fibre (cf. ZAID 2002).

Lif can be woven to different strengths of ropes called Hibal (sing. Hibl, حبل). Ropes are used for the handles of baskets, the bridles for donkeys and camels, for carrying water containers attached to a stick and to string the frames of the traditional beds.

Lif, preferably from Gau date trees is also used as a soft but durable filling material called Lihaf (لحاف). Among the older Manasir Lihaf is preferred to cotton for filling mattresses and considered very healthy. Lif is further employed to fill of the lower parts of donkey saddles in order to prevent sores by friction and called Libdah (لبدة) or Bedidah (بديدة – the "ة" can be substituted by a "ى"). The Bedouin Manasir employ Lif for the same purpose in their camel saddles and call it Tillah (تلّة).

Lif further plays an important role in the Sudanese coffee tradition as the straining plug Lifei (ليفي) in the spout of the Gabenah (جبنة).

== Sabitah (سبيطة) ==
The fruit bunch of the female palm tree is also called Shakhlub (شخلوب) and consists of a central stem and about 100 to 150 strands of spikelets. The whole cluster can be used as a broom to sweep the ground whereby it is called Hanquqah (حنقوقة).

But also some of the finest basketry of the region is created by wrapping palm leaflets, preferably of the Dum palm around a strand of spikelets. The resulting strand is spirally plaited to dishes. They are either used as a Kabbet (كبّت) for covering meals or the earthen water containers (Sir, زير), or as a Tabaq (طبق) in the shape of flat bowl for serving the traditional Kisrah bread (كسرة) on special occasions. The central part of Tabaqat can be worked from leather. Straps of cloth or plastic may be added to the leaflets in order to make the work more colourful and water resistant.

== Other raw materials ==
Apart from the listed by-products of palm trees, wood of other trees and the leather of the animals are used by the Manasir to manufacture tools and household items.

The finest but rarely found handicraft of the region are big bowls (Tabaq, طبق), skillfully crafted out of the soft wood of Faidherbia albida (Haraz, حراز). Haraz wood is also used for the lower parts of donkey saddles. Nowadays the practise of fine wood carving has declined rapidly, one reason being the shortage of the particularly suitable Haraz tree.

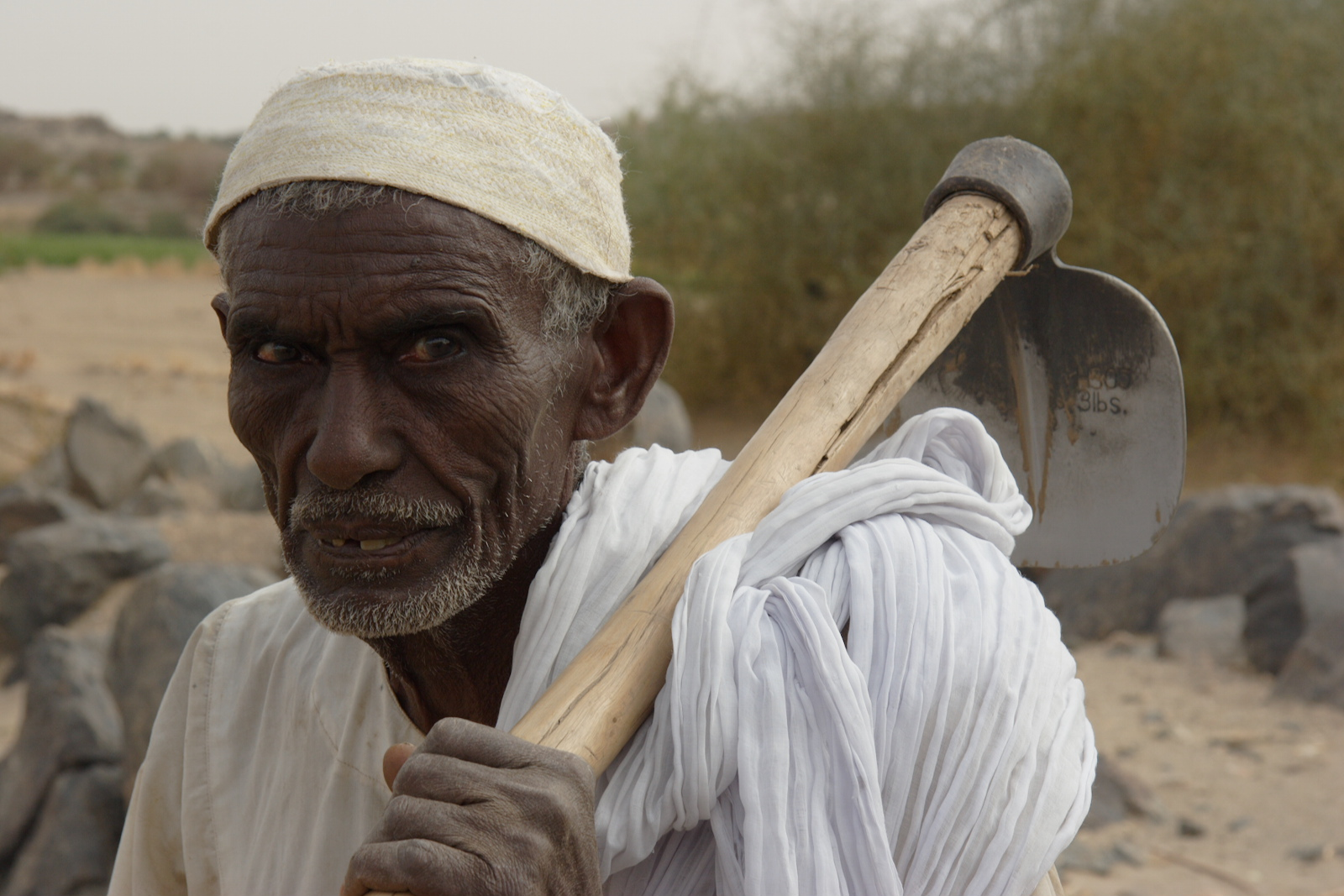
Turiah (طورية)

The most common agricultural tools in Dar al-Manasir are the Turiah (طورية), a hoe with an angular blade that proves very functional in opening and closing irrigation channels, and a small sawed sickle. Whereas the blade of the Turiah is bought from outside and often even imported from China, all wooden handles are locally produced. A different local impediment entirely manufactured from wood is the rake-like Arbil (اربيل) used for levelling the ground.

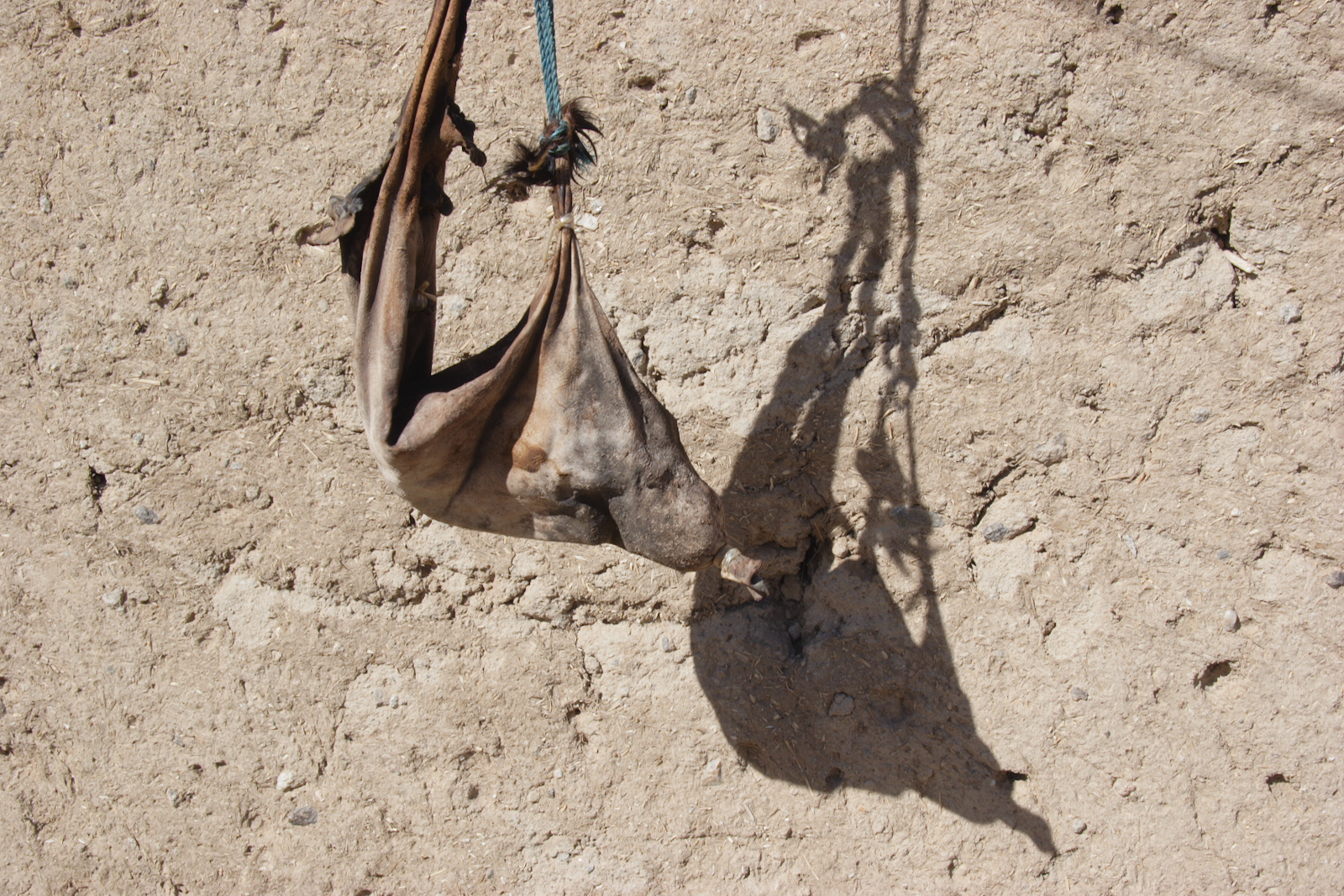
dry Qirbah (قربة)

Very popular among the Bedouin Manasir is the Qirbah (قربة), a hose made from the entire skin of a goat. Filled with a liquid it becomes moist and flexible. The Qirbah is hung in a shady windy place, either from the ceiling, a beam or on a wooden tripod. Due to constant evaporation its content is cooled down considerably. The riverain Manasir employ the Qirbah primarily for cooling fermented milk since their water is cooled in huge permeable earthen jars called Sir (زير). These jars are placed in the shadow of a tree or lined up in a row in isolated covered mud structures called Masirah (مزيرة).

[Information by 'Abdallah Ahmad al-Hassan Abu Qurun from Mideimir (عبدالله أحمد الحسن أبو قرون من مديمر) on the western bank of the Nile, Halimah Hassan al-'Aqib from Khaliwah (حليمة حسن العقيب من خليوة في سور) and Al-Tahir 'Uthman al-Tahir from Musari' (الطاهير عثمان الطاهير من مزارع في سور) on Sur Island

== References and external links ==
- Crowfoot, J. W. (1918): "Customs of the Rubatab". In: Sudan Notes and Records, Vol.1. pp. 119–134.
- Nicholls, W. (1918): "The Sakia in Dongola Province". In: Sudan Notes and Records, Vol.1. pp. 21–24.
- Qasim, A. SH. (2002): Qamus al-Lahgah al-'Amiya fi al-Sudan. 3rd ed. p. 1076. (عون الشريف قاسم (2002): قاموس اللهجة العامية في السودان. الطبعة الثالثة. الدار السودانية للكتب. س 1076)
- Salih, A. M. (1999): The Manasir of the Northern Sudan: Land and People. A Riverain Society and Resource Scarcity. 282 p.
- Zaid, A. (ed.) (2002): Date Palm Cultivation. FAO Plant Production and Protection Paper 156, Rev. 1
- Homepage of Dar al-Manasir
- Gallery of Dar al-Manasir
- Al-Turath al-Sha'ibi li-Qabilah al-Manasir
- Diwan 'Abqariah al-Manasir. Li-Ustadh Ibrahim 'Ali al-Sha'ir
- Homepage of the Humboldt University Nubian Expedition (H.U.N.E.)
