= Date cultivation in Dar al-Manasir =

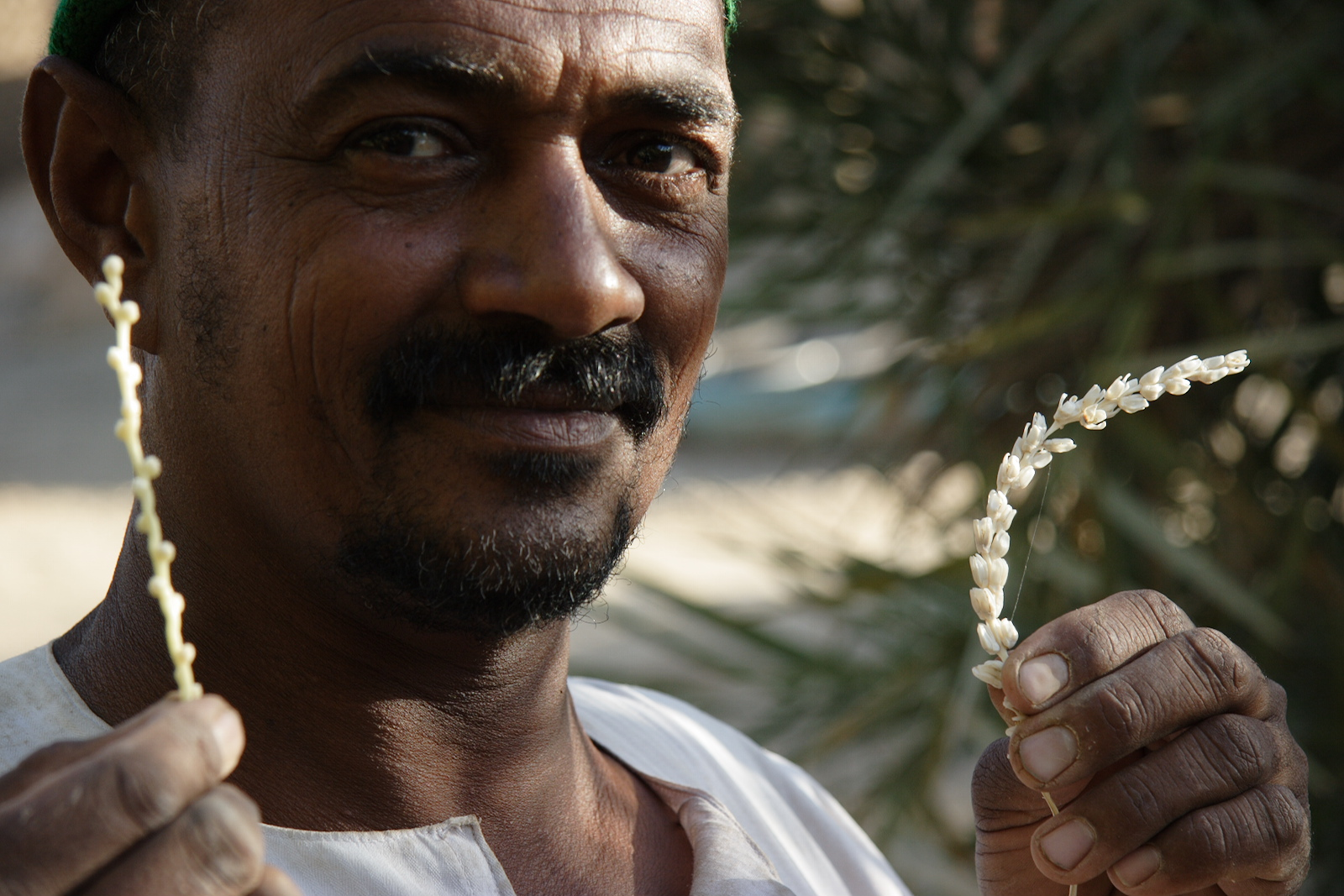
The female Tamim and the male date flower (Arabic: تميم).

Date palms are cultivated in Sudan from the Egyptian border in the north all the way along the Nile south of Khartoum until Sennar. In addition to the banks of the Nile, isolated occurrences of cultivated date trees occur in the Red Sea Hills in the vicinity of Port Sudan, in Kassala, along the Atbara River, in the deserts around Dongola and far Southwest in Darfur, for example in Wadi Kutum, Wadi Mellit and Barra. In all these locations, the palm trees depend on accessible ground water or on irrigation. The water for irrigation is either taken from wells or from the river Nile, where it is nowadays provided by diesel pumps.

Sudan is among the countries that produce good quality dates. Bilad al-Mahas, Sukut, Dongola, Dar al-Shaiqiyah, Dar al-Manasir, Dar al-Rubatab and the areas around Bauqah and Berber along the Nile boast extensive date groves. In each date growing region a particular composition of palm tree varieties, including endemic species, are grown. During the Anglo-Egyptian Condominium (1899—1955), Dar al-Manasir had been described as the southernmost limit of date cultivation in the Sudan

== Land classification ==
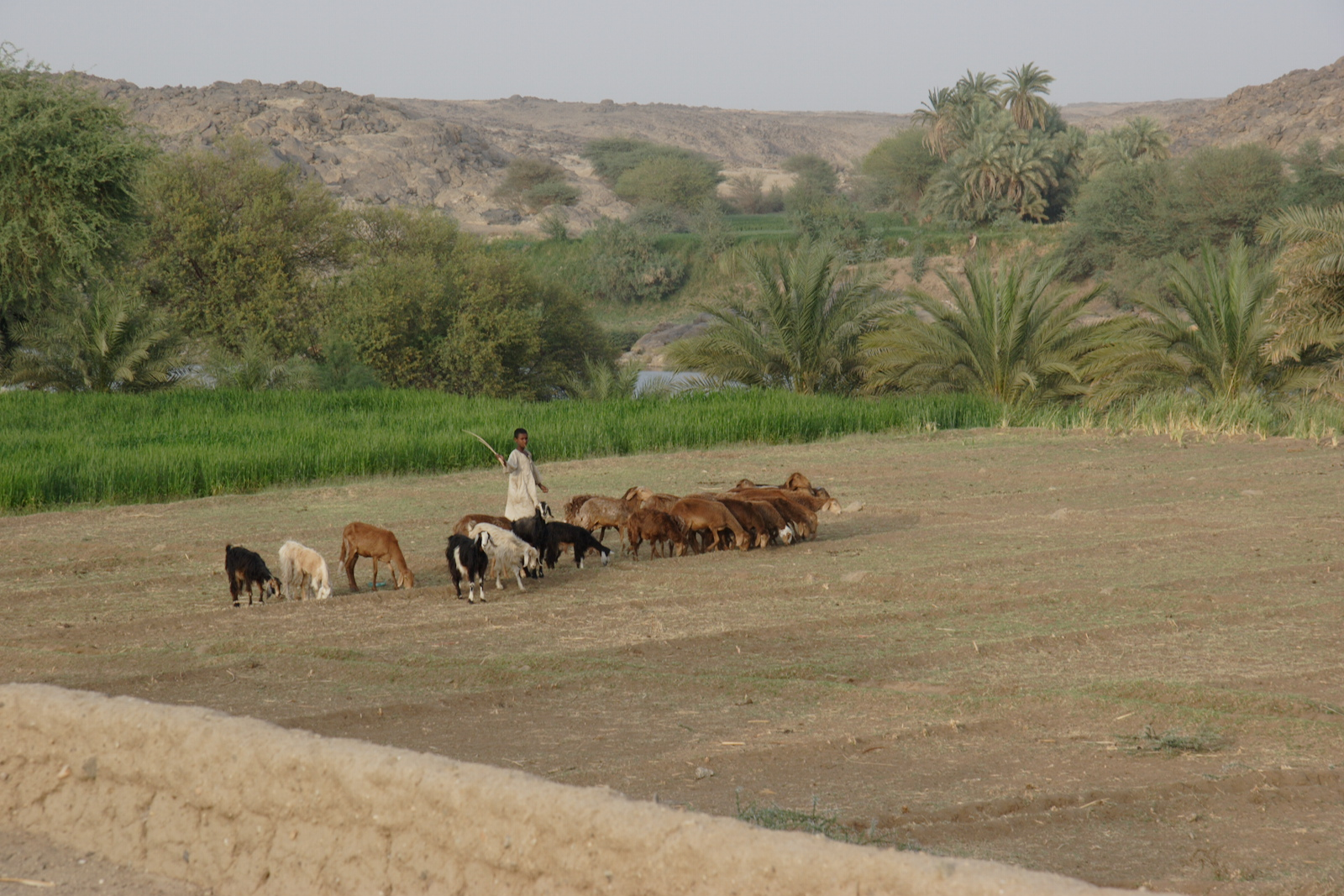
Ashu (أشو) land with palm trees.

When approaching Dar al-Manasir from the surrounding deserts, the most striking feature of the landscape is the sudden green narrow band of palm trees lining the shores of the Nile. This strip of land is called Ashu (أشو), and is generally not more than 20 meters wide. It is situated between the seasonally inundated land of the river bank called Gerif (جرف) and the traditional "waterwheel land" called Saqiah (ساقية).

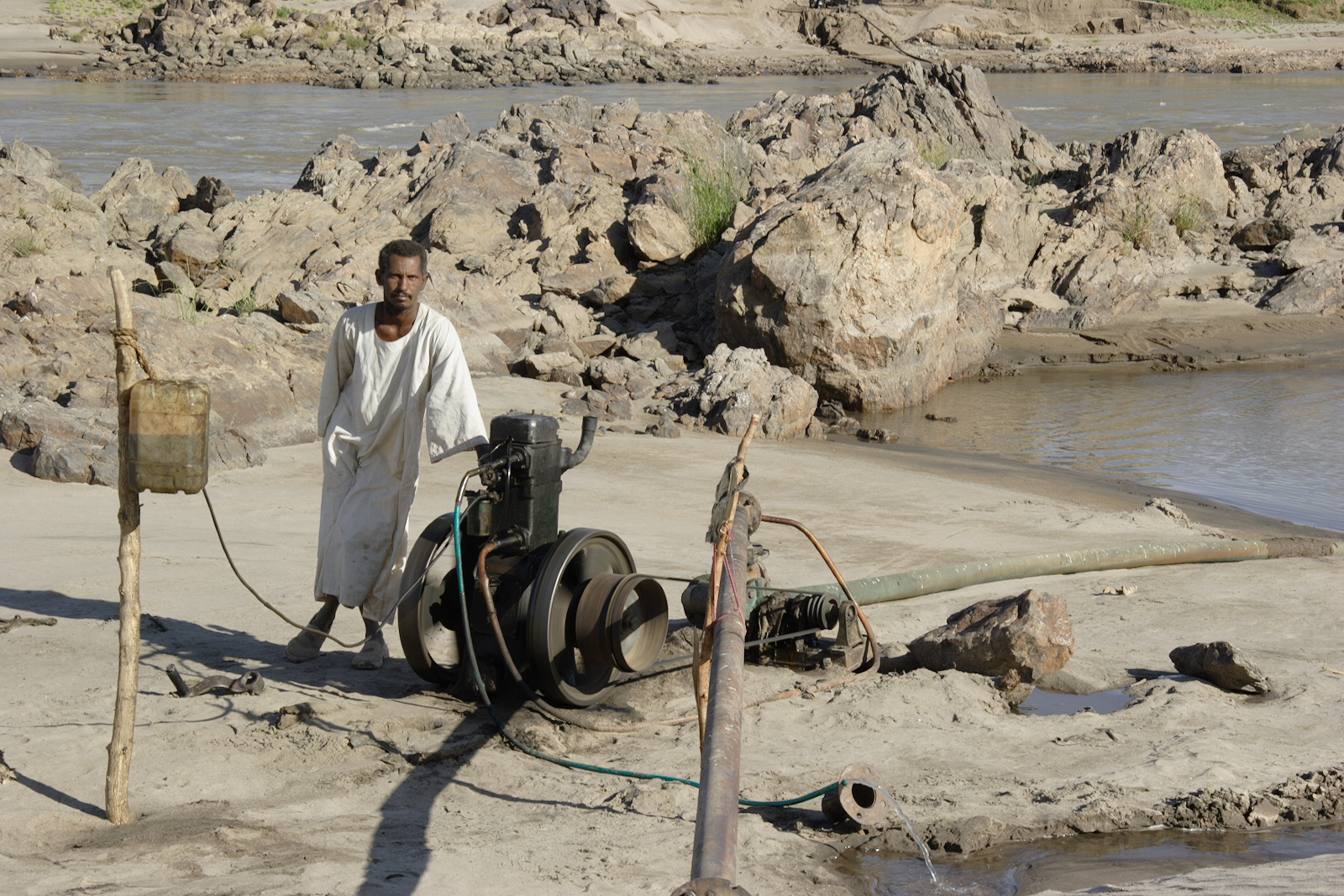
Diesel pump along the Nile.

Date palm trees and Doum palms (Hyphaene thebaica) are perfectly adapted to the regional climate of Dar al-Manasir. They are drought resistant and can withstand the exceptionally hot dry and rainless summers and cold dry winters. The proximity of Ashu land to the river Nile makes the water table accessible to the deeply penetrating roots of fully grown palm trees throughout the year, making it the most valuable class of land. Since dates constitute the most relevant cash crop in Dar al-Manasir their cultivation is not limited to Ashu land only, but expands along the irrigation channels of the Saqiah land. During recent years date trees even substitute seasonally irrigated crops such as wheat, beans and okra on the traditional Saqiah land.

== Propagation ==
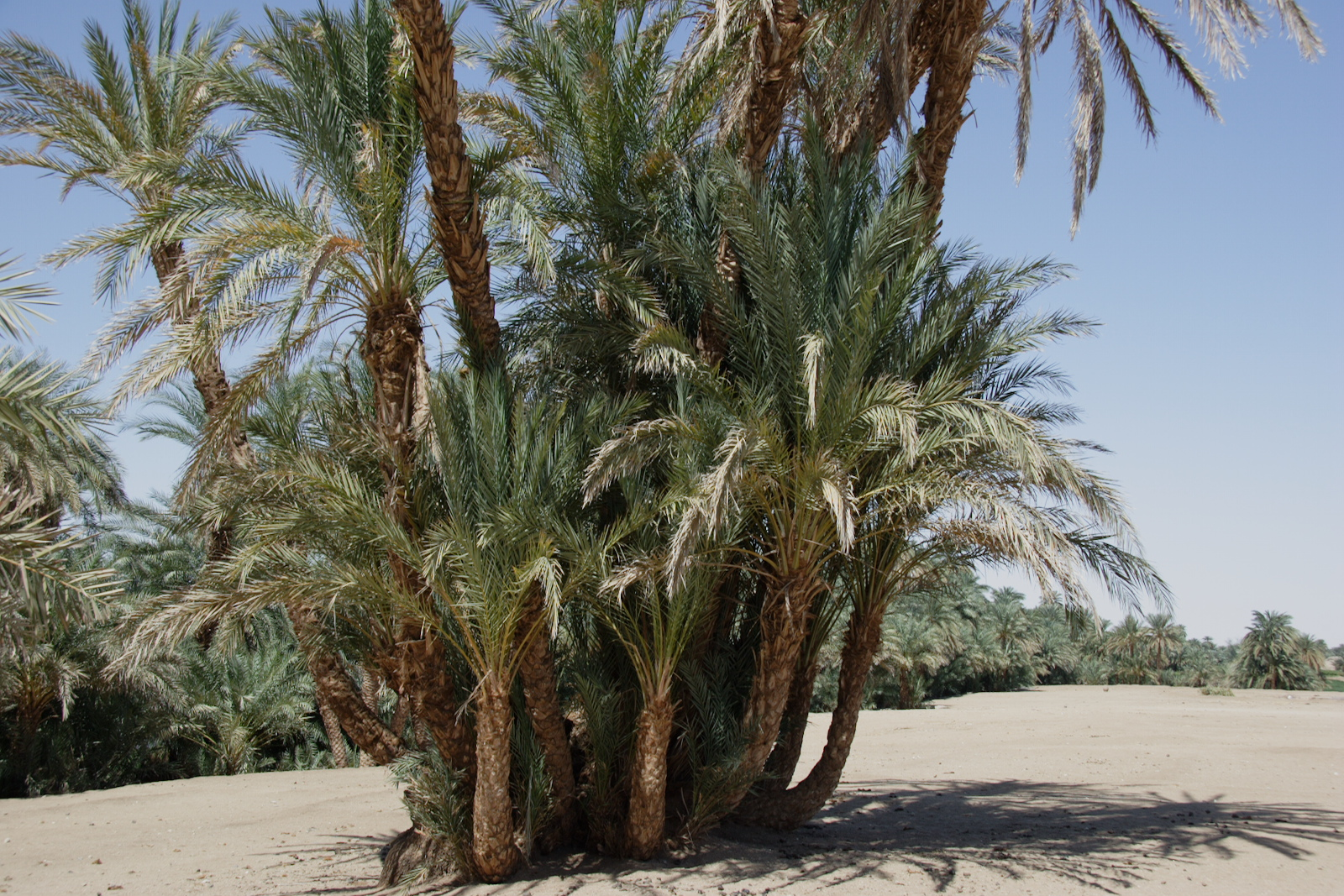
Bu'rah (بؤرة) of a Gau tree.

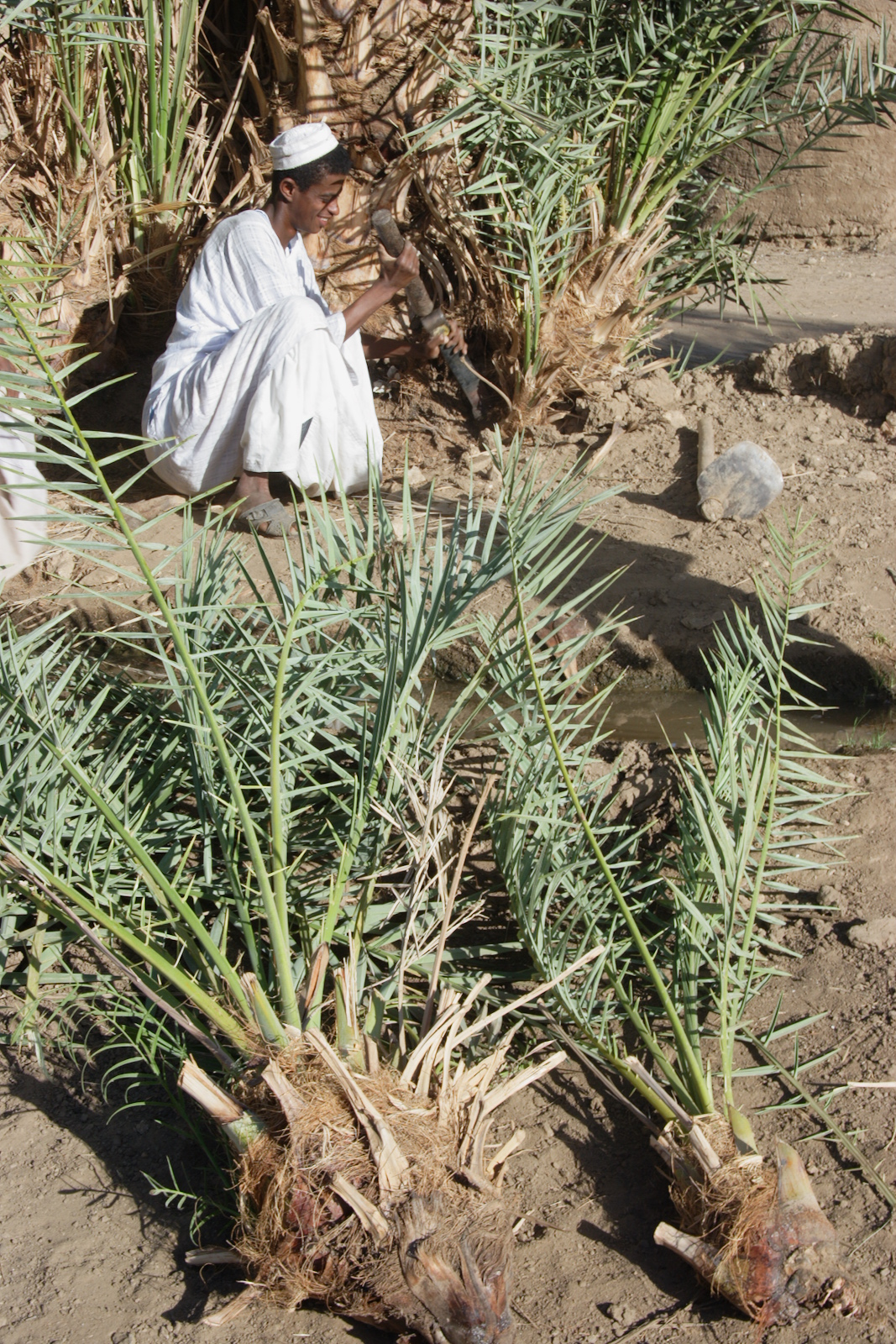
Shatla (شتلا).

In order to multiply the number of fruit-bearing trees traditional offshoot propagation is practised all along the Nile in Sudan. Lower offshoots called Shatla (شتلا) develop from axillary buds at the lower trunk of a parent palm and are cut off during early spring season. A well chosen offshoot will not only guarantee a female fruit bearing palm tree but also inherit the same qualities of its mother plant. The date trees in the region of the Fourth Cataract attain an age of up to 150 years and consist most often of multiple shoots from a single clump called Bu'rah or Hufrah (بؤرة or حفرة). Satisfactory date production ceases with an age of 90 to 100 years. With increasing age and height the palm tree becomes more difficult to climb in order to be pollinated and harvested.

== Pollination ==
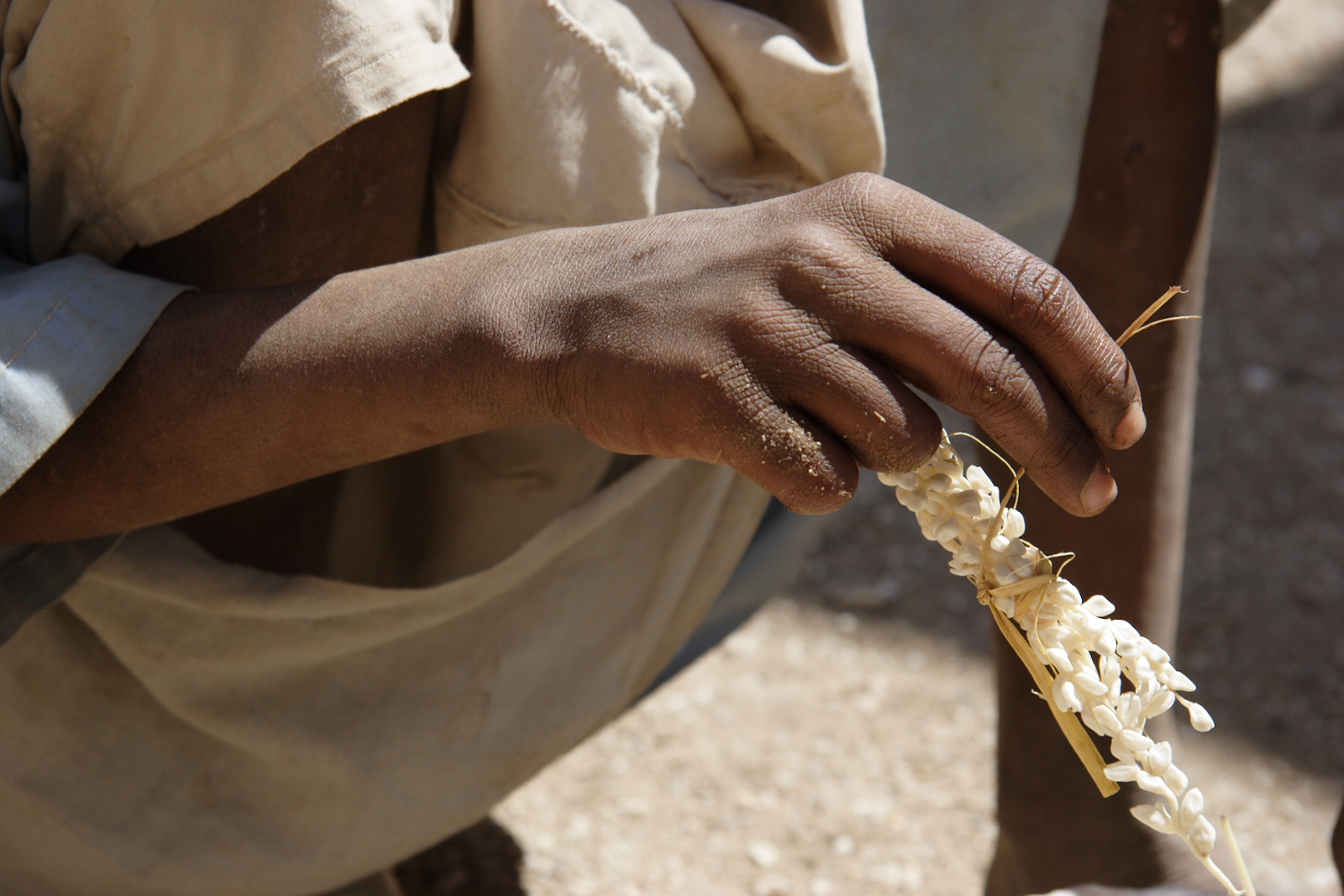
Rabetah Qaru'ah (ربطة قرعة).

Date pollinator with fresh strands of male flower.

Date pollinator up an 'Abid Rahim (عبد رحيم) palm tree.

Pollination of the female fruits is conducted in late February and beginning of March which is, according to the Coptic calendar still used for agricultural purposes by the Manasir, the end of the month Amshir. During this season the stout male spathes split and their inflorescences reach maturity. Fresh strands of flowers are carefully picked out of the male clusters and packaged to strands of two called Rabetah Qaru'ah (ربطة قرعة). The Manasir consider the variety of a potent male seedling irrelevant and pollinate all their female inflorescences from the same male tree. The process of pollination is called Qaffes (قفّز) and can be carried out by any person physically able to climb the palm tree. In each spathe of female inflorescence about 8-15 packages are tucked between the fruit bearing spikelets. An adult female palm produces around 15 to 25 spathes, each spathe containing 150 to 200 date bearing spikelets.

== Stages of growth ==
Dates have to pass five stages of growth before developing into ripe fruits (Tamr, تمر) that are harvested in August and September:

1. Tamim (تميم): During the first 15 days up to one month the emerging fruits are of no use.
2. Dafiq (دفيق): The subsequent green stage lasts for about 2 1/2 months and the growing fruits are still bitter. Depending on the variety a certain ratio of the fruits falls off prematurely. These green dates are fed to the livestock.
3. 'Aifanunah (عيفنونة): This interval lasts between 10 and 15 days during which the fruits acquire their sweetness. Children will start eating fruits that are about to fall off.
4. Safuri (صفوري): During the following month the maturing fruits don't fall off easily anymore. Some date varieties can already be harvested.
5. Umm Ra's (أم رأس): This final stage of ripening is also called Rutab (رطب). The fruits are turning brown from their end towards the perianth. The Manasir never cut the whole fruit bunch called Shakhlub (شخلوب) but only single spikelets, with the result of thinning out the clusters and letting the remaining fruits gain in size.

== Harvest ==
Once a date tree is successfully planted it constitutes an economic plant returning good yearly yields for little labour. A mature date tree supplied with sufficient water and natural fertilizer (Sibalah, زبالة) will produce in-between two and three sacks (Shawal, شوال) each about 75 kilos (1 Shawal = 15 Ruba' = 123.75 litres. The exact amount depends strongly on the date variety, the specific growing conditions and age of the palm tree. A survey of the region in 1995 reported an average ownership of 26 date trees per household, producing approximately 900 kg annually .

Traditionally the harvest is stored in old water jars (Sir, زيرor Gerr, جرّ) that are preparatorily lined with ash. A further layer of ash on top seals it and protects the fruits from maggots (Sus, سوس), (cf. Material Culture of the Manasir).

== Cultural relevance and traditions ==
Each farming household in Dar al-Manasir owns or at least shares a number of date trees. They are a viable source of income and nutrition.

harvested Dum palm tree (الدوم) with assorted by-products.

Date and Doum palms are not only important because of their edible fruits. The by-products of these trees make up the essential raw material for locally produced tools and handicrafts (cf. Material Culture of the Manasir).

In addition, date seeds (Nawa, نوى) and the Dafiq-fruits are used as fodder. They are recommended to improve the taste of both meat and milk of the livestock. The seeds are crushed on lower grinding stones (Tāhūnah, طاحونة - originally used for grinding flour). Surplus is sold at the weekly local market Suq Salamat and is the most expensive kind of fodder.

Date trees also constitute a constant source of pride and belonging. The special relationship between the Manasir and their palm trees is reflected in local traditions and sayings:

Whenever a new date shoot is planted the process is accompanied by a traditional invocation; the Bismallah is followed by the sentence "The intention (نية) is white and the soil (طين) is black. The fruits of this tree are freely offered (صدقة) to the beggar, freely offered to the thief". That is to say that the tree should provide alms in the name of Allah to whoever is in need of it, and therefore should be under His protection.

Salih recorded a similar saying in Birti: "It has been planted for hungry people, passing by guests, wayfarers, thieves, good will seekers, enemies and friends". The author is further bringing a custom to attention that permits everybody in Dar al-Manasir to collect date fruits for immediate consumption. This custom, usually applied only to dates fallen to the ground and for women and children, differs from the national Islamic and statuary law on that matter.

== Monetary value and compensation ==
The mentioned economic, cultural and social factors result in a practical inconceivability of selling palm trees as real assets among the Manasir. The situation in the 1920s, as described by Leach (1919) with the following words is still very much true of today;

"… a man being in need of money, but disliking the thought of parting from the whole of his property, might sell half a tree. This however was a very rare occurrence, and was only resorted to occasionally in cases of real distress and only in […] the poorest part of the province. […] In ordinary circumstances it was a disgrace to sell either land or date trees".

To quote the Mansuri 'Abdallah Ahmad al-Hassan Abu Qurun (عبدالله أحمد الحسن أبو قرون) in 2005:

"I have almost seen all of Dar al-Manasir and I know of whole gardens being sold in the [neighbouring] Shaiqiyah Country and Rubatab Country. But I know of no more than two instances when a Mansuri ever sold his palm trees. And in both cases they only sold one, two or three trees reacting in an emergency situation. Usually, in such situations of financial difficulties the people will ask the person to be patient until they collectively manage to come up with the necessary money. This is why you cannot put a price on a palm tree; you would not be able to sell it. Date trees do not have a price! Your palm trees and your offspring are regarded as one (التمر دي و جناك واحيد)".

This attitude of the Manasir is reflected in the practice of local merchants issuing loans to peasants in exchange for prospected harvests of particular trees.

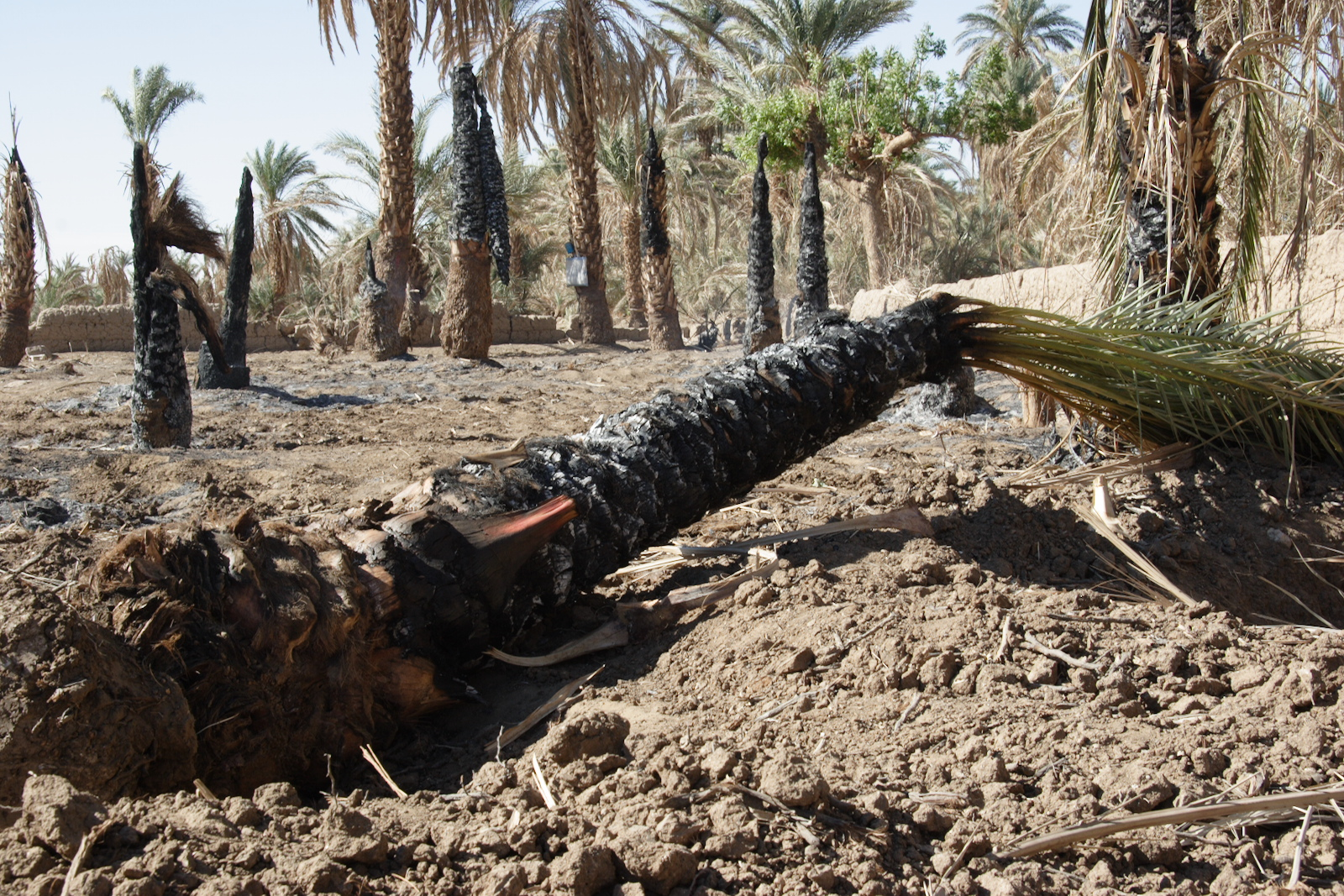
Compensated palm trees and destroyed village of

Shatla are planted on Saqiah land in 2005.

For most Manasir it is therefore inconceivable to receive monetary compensation in exchange for their palm trees which are going to be flooded together with their villages and other agricultural land as a result of the erection of the Hamdab High Dam (Marawi Multi-Purpose Hydro Project). According to al-Hakem (1993:6) about 675,000 productive date trees will be lost in the course of flooding the reservoir lake. The information brochure of the Manasir Committee speaks of 250,000 productive and 300,000 male or not yet fruit-bearing date trees in the year 2003 (تقدير النخيل المثمر فى عام 2003 م=250.000 نخلة تقريبا و تقدير النخيل الغير مثمر فى عام 2003 م=300.000 نخلة تقريبا).

In spring 2005 there still has not been any reliable information and therefore much confusion among the local population on the matter of which palm trees (depending on the status of land, age of trees and amount of taxes previously paid) are eventually going to be compensated and for how much. Apart from the monetary compensation, each 120 date trees on private property are supposedly to be compensated with one Feddan (4,200 m^{2}) of land in the new relocation areas.

Since the local peasants are still kept unclear about the actual level of the reservoir lake and its consequences for the Nile water regime and the banks of the artificial lake, many nourish hopes to be able to continue living and cultivating their homeland. As a consequence only months ahead of forced resettlement new shoots of date trees are transplanted to higher areas and irrigated with much effort.

Even in the unlikely case of a reasonable monetary compensation, the loss of their date trees would pose a hardship especially for the older Manasir, who laboriously cultivated these trees to be able to live from their harvest in their old age when they can't work in the agriculture anymore.

== Date cultivars ==
The Manasir are renowned all throughout the Sudan for cultivating a wide range of date palm cultivars. Any small farming household tends to grow a variety of dates in order to be less vulnerable both to annually changing market prices and diseases affecting only specific types.

The people are very proud of the taste, sweetness and nourishing merits of their dates and believe that these originate from their rocky land containing special minerals. The dates from Dar al-Manasir compare well with dates of other regions in Sudan, although earlier reports qualify them as being of inferior quality not fetching the market price of fruits from (Old) Halfa and Dongola

Date varieties and the average wholesale price during the harvest season 2004

(Dinars per sack Shawal, شوال – at about 75 kg; 1 Shawal = 15 Rub' (ربع) = 123.75 litres):

| Wad Laqai | (ود لقاي) | SDin. 60 |
| Wad Khatib | (ود ختيب) | SDin. 50 |
| Barakawi | (بركاوي) | SDin. 75-80 |
| 'Abid Rahim | (عبد رحيم) | SDin. 75-80 |
| Bur | (بور) | SDin. 60 |
| Bireir | (برير) | SDin. 60 |
| Qundeil | (قنديل) | SDin. 75-80 |
| Bit Tamudhah | (بت تموضة) | SDin. 65 |
| Gau | (جاو) | SDin. 45-50 |

(prices reported by Al-Tayib Babikir Ahmad Muhammad from Mideimir (الطيّب بابكر أحمد محمّد من مديمر), local resident who studied agriculture for 4½ years in Halfah al-Gadidah.)

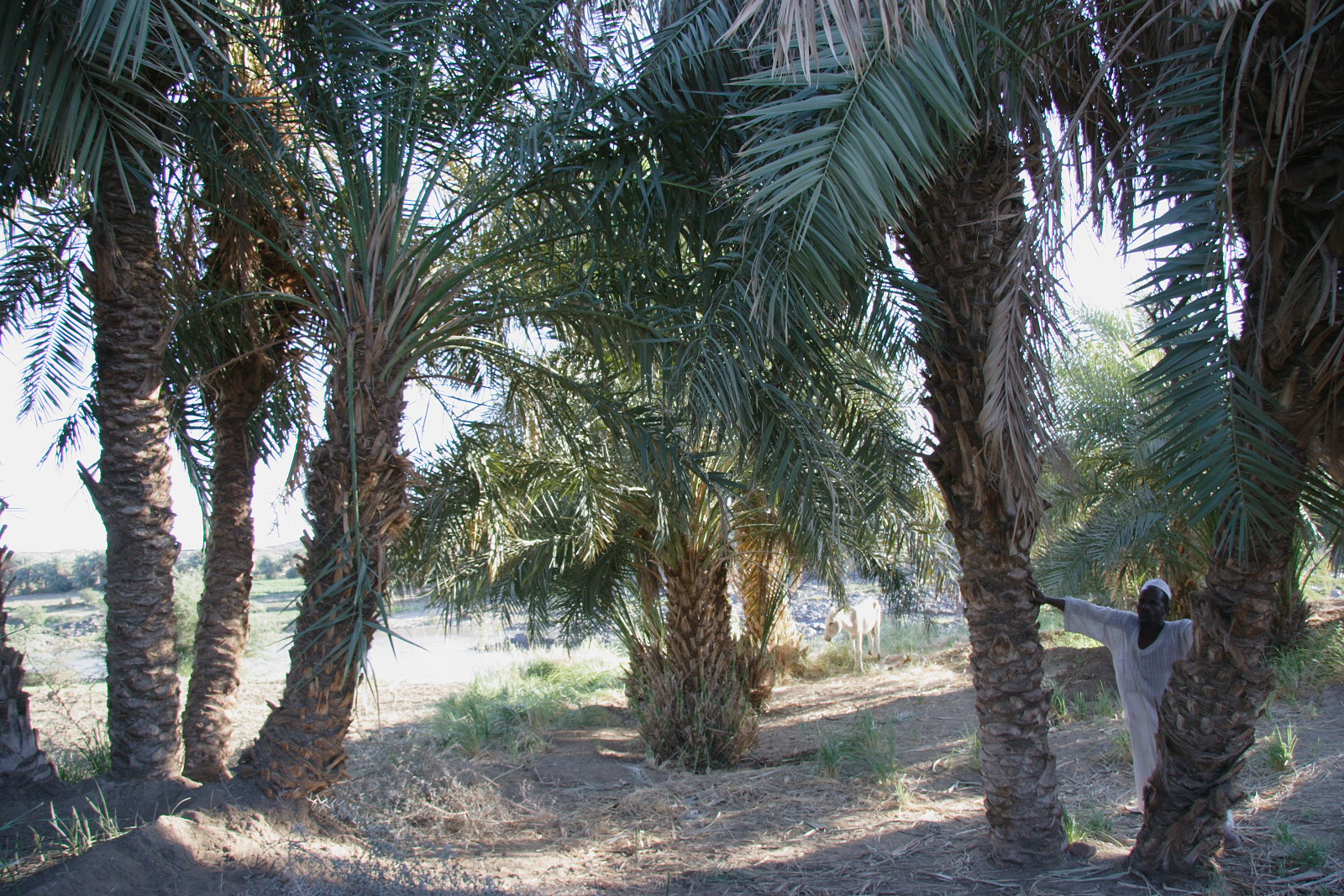
Wad Laqai palm tree (ود لقاي).

=== Mishriq (مشرق) ===
Mishriq dates are the most common and cherished variety in Dar al-Manasir. Two types are differentiated; Wad Laqai and the more common Wad Khatib, formerly also called Umm Laqai and Umm Khatib. Both types are non-Nubian and originate in the area. Mishriq trees require more watering than other palm trees.

=== Wad Laqai (ود لقاي) ===
The Wad Laqai type is mostly found in the upstream end of Dar al-Manasir and in the neighbouring Rubatab Country around Abu Hammed. According to Yusif (1995:274) its full name is al-Mashriq Walid Laqai (المشرق ولد لقاي) which would literally translate "to the East of the son of Laqai". The author further states that this variety has been introduced by the son of a person called Laqai, who imported it from Hejaz in Saudi Arabia where the dates are called Sukari (السكري). Wad Laqai has been apparently introduced to Sudan in the vicinity of the Island of Muqrat.

Wad Laqai is considered to be one of the finest date fruits in the Sudan with an unrivalled softness and fresh taste. Some older Manasir still prefer to drink their tea along with a handful of Wad Laqai dates as the traditional sugar substitute. The dates should be left to dry on the tree, because of difficulties to remove the ripe fruits without causing adjacent dates from the same bunch (Shakhlub, شخلوب) to fall off prematurely. Another peculiarity of the Wad Laqai type is that its fruits should not be pollinated before reaching the green stage (Dafiq, دفيق). They are also considered most sensitive and therefore difficult to harvest. If fresh dates are picked others on the bunch easily turn into Karmush

The fruits are soft in consistency and can be pressed to form a cake called 'Agwah (عجوة). The sample fruits, taken from Al-Atamanin on Shiri Island (العطمانين في شري), are short (about 3 centimeters), compact (width about 1.5 centimeters) and reddish in color. According to Yusif (1995:274) Wad Laqai fruits can also become rather oblong reaching the span of an index finger.

The leaves of Wad Laqai palms are wide and sweeping. The shape of the tree is similar to the Qundeil variety.

=== Wad Khatib (ود ختيب) ===
Wad Khatib is the type of Mishriq palm trees best adapted to the stony and often shallow soil of the Fourth Cataract region. Yusif (1995:274) recalls that Wad Khatib had been introduced from Saudi Arabia by a man from Hejaz called Bashir bin Khatib (بشير بن خطيب), apparently a descendant of Imam al-Shafi'i (رجل من الشوفعة). Wad Khatib is the most common variety of date trees in Dar al-Manasir and the neighbouring Rubatab Country.

The quality of Wad Khatib dates is generally inferior to Wad Laqai dates. Wad Khatib trees are recommended to be pollinated ahead of the Wad Laqai type. Part of their harvest is traditionally used for local alcohol production.

The sample fruits, from Sulhah on Sherari Island (صلحة في شرري), are even shorter and appear less reddish in colour than those of Wad Laqai. The perianth of their fruits is attached stronger to the spikelets of the fruit bunch.

The appearance of the Wad Khatib palm tree differs from the other Mishriq type mainly by having slightly broader leaves.

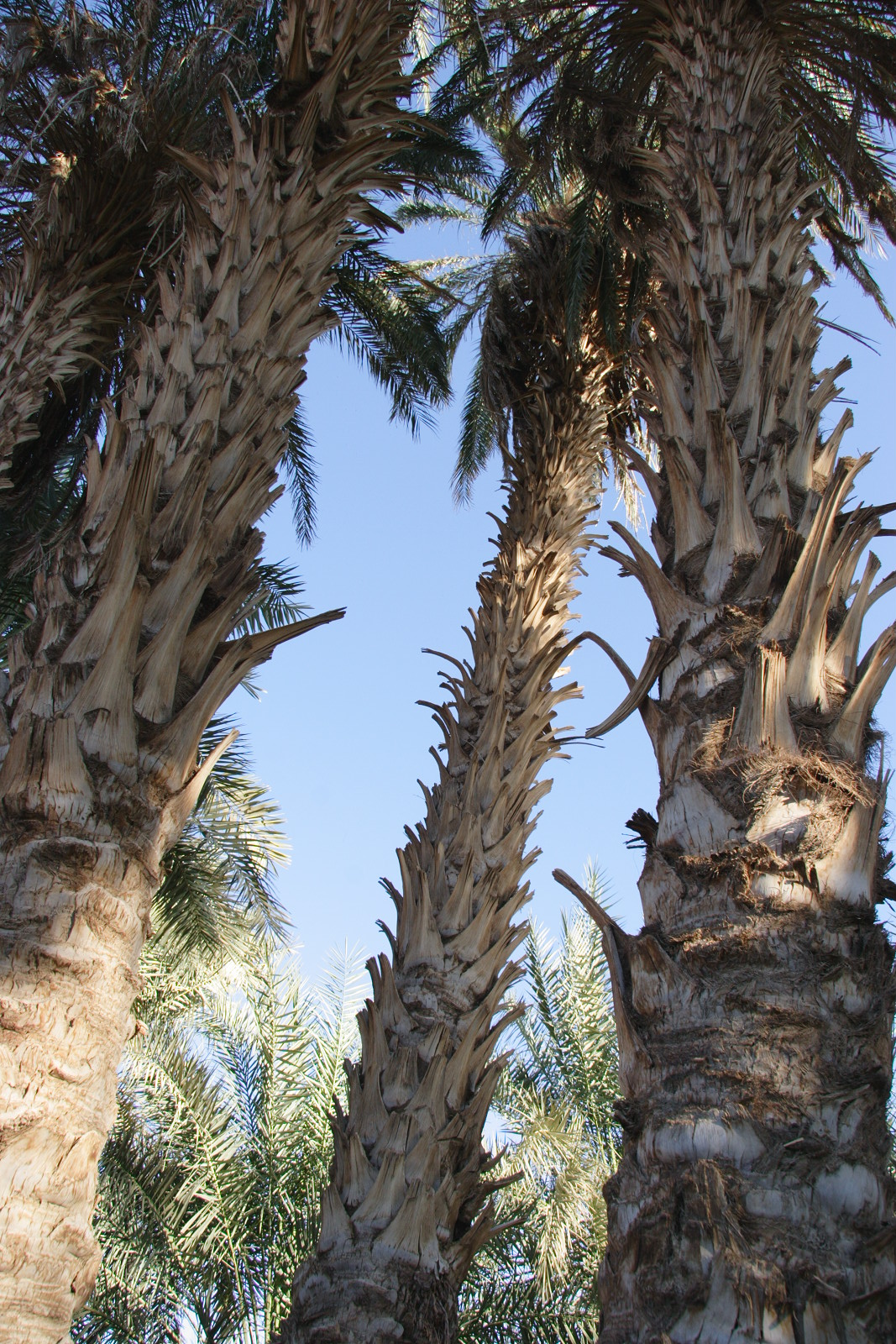
Trunks of tall Barakawi palm trees (بركاوي).

=== Barakawi (بركاوي) ===
Barakawi dates are nowadays considered by many Manasir to be the most profitable date cultivar.

Barakawi trees are increasingly planted on the Saqiah land, traditionally reserved for seasonally irrigated crops. Barakawi are highly demanded on the national market and according to Yusif (1995:274) are even exported to Egypt where they are also referred to as Ibrimi (ابريمي) and Sakuti (سكوتي). Barakawi are not among the most common palm trees in Dar al-Manasir, but their number increases considerably towards the downstream end and in the neighbouring Shaiqiyah Country with a centre of cultivation in the area of Karima. YUSIF (1995:274) states further that Barakawi dates have been introduced from Mahas and the Shaiqiyah Country through Dar al-Manasir to the Rubatab Country in the beginning of the 20th century.

The sample fruits, from Sulhah on Sherari Island (صلحة في شرري), are elongated, their proportions with about 5 centimeters length and 1.5 centimeters width being slightly longer than and not as thin as the average 'Abid Rahim variety. Their deep reddish-brown colour changes from the centre of the fruits towards the perianth into a light yellow discolouration.

Barakawi palms are among the taller varieties of palm trees in Dar al-Manasir.

=== 'Abid Rahim (عبد رحيم) ===
The ʿAbid Rahim cultivar is favoured in Eastern Sudan. These dates are said to cause flatulence when consumed in large quantities.

The sample fruits, from Sulhah on Sherari Island (صلحة في شرري), are distinguishable from the otherwise similar Barakawi type by being longer (about 6 centimeters), thinner (1-1.5 centimeters) and lighter in weight. Their colour varies from a light yellow to a reddish brown.

ʿAbid Rahim trees are tall and potentially produce the highest quantity of harvest compared to other varieties in Dar al-Manasir. The shape of the palm is somewhat confined, with their leaves more upright.

Bur palm trees (بور).

=== Bur (بور) ===
The Bur cultivar exists only in the region of the Fourth Cataract. Bur palm trees, along with the Bireir and Qundeil varieties are only producing a limited quantity of harvest because a good share of their fruits is falling off the trees prematurely during the early stages of growth. Due to this unfavourable characteristic the number of cultivated Bur trees remains limited.

Bur dates are easily distinguishable from other date types by their nearly black colour. The sample fruits, from Sulhah on Sherari Island (صلحة في شرري), appear well proportioned, about 4 cm long and fleshy. Bur dates can be eaten both fresh and dry, but should be consumed only in small amounts.

Bur palms are among the taller palm trees in Dar al-Manasir.

=== Bireir (برير) ===
Bireir trees, alike the Mishriq and Bur varieties are of non-Nubian origin. Their fruits are praised for their quality, the flesh closing firmly upon the seed thereby staying soft and juicy for a long time. Their taste is attributed to be "hot" that is to say very sweet and tasty. Yusif (1995:277) quotes a local saying from the neighbouring Rubatab Country, by which a bird feeding too much on dates from the Bireir variety would suffer from a dry stomach, eventually causing it to drop dead from the sky. Bireir dates like Wad Laqai dates can be sold as a compressed cake called 'Agwah (عجوة). Bireir dates are also traditionally used for the production of local wine (Khumur, خمور).

Yusif (1995:279) differentiates four cultivars of the Bireir type in the neighbouring Rubatab Country;

- Madini (المديني), similar to Mishriq and mother to the Bar Tamud type (بر تمود)
- Barni (برني), allegedly introduced from Medina (Saudi Arabia) by Sheikh Muhammad bin al-Gazuli (شيخ محمّد بن الجزولي)
- Kullimah (الكلّمة), similar to the Qundeil variety but more circular and bigger in size,
- Dahul (دهول), closely resembling the Bur variety.

Bireir palms are among the taller palm trees in Dar al-Manasir.

=== Qundeil (قنديل) ===
The Qundeil variety has been introduced to Dar al-Manasir from the regions of Mahas and Sukut north of Dongola during the past decades. Like the Bur and Bireir varieties their produce in the region of the Fourth Cataract is limited by the fact that a good share of their fruits fall off prematurely.

The fruit is substantial, its taste not very sweet.

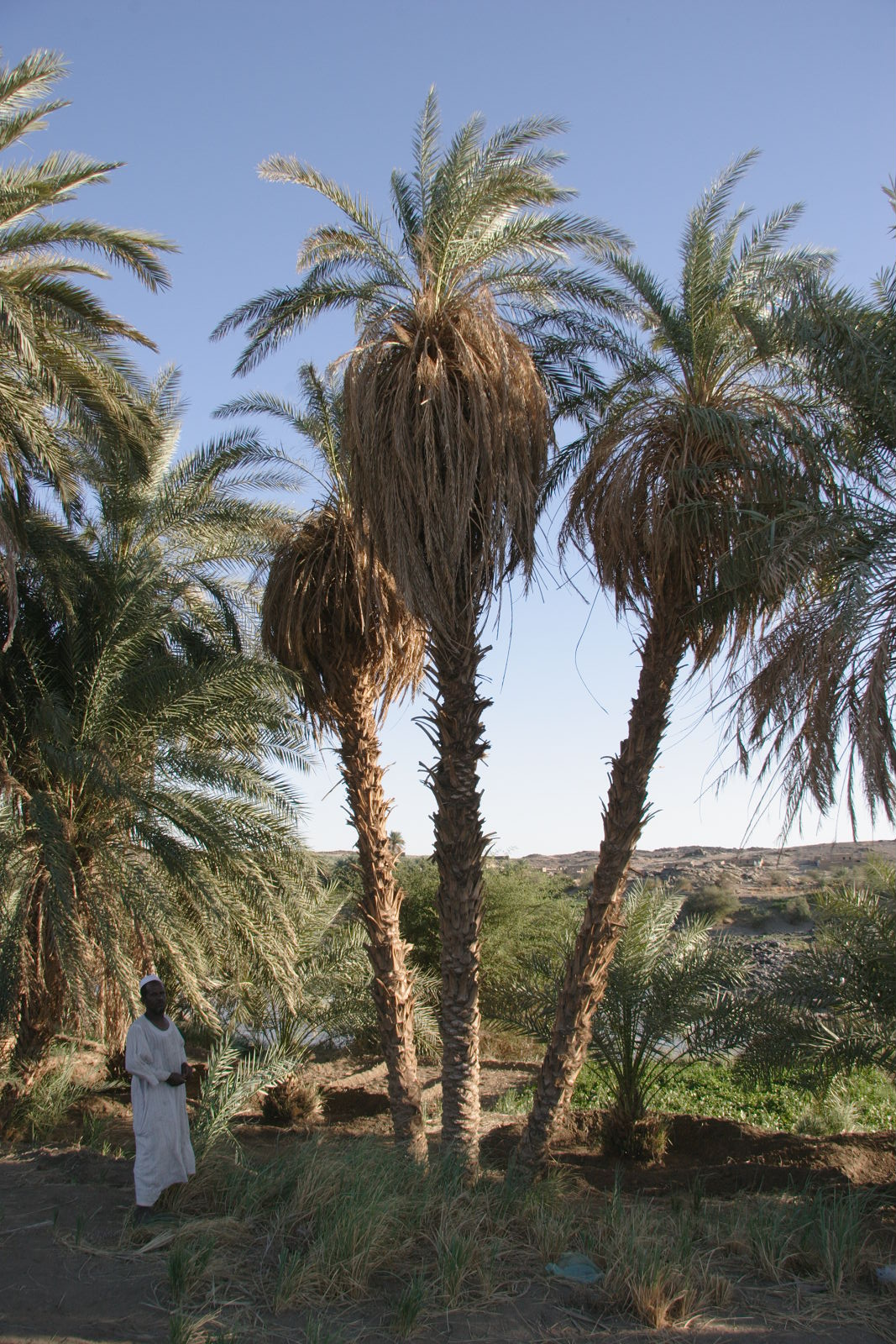
Bit Tamudhah palm tree (بت تموضة).

=== Bit Tamudhah (بت تموضة) ===
The Bit Tamudhah variety is rarely to be found in Dar al-Manasir and has been introduced from the area of Mahas north of Dongola.

=== Tamarat Muhummed (تمرات محمّد) ===
Tamarat Muhummed is alternatively called Diqis (دقس) and 'Akish (عكيش) and among the uncommon varieties in Dar al-Manasir. Its trees are known to produce high quantities of fruits.

=== Gau (جاو) ===
Gau dates can originate from self-sown trees or date varieties that have reverted to kind either through uncongenial surroundings, improper cultures, insufficient water or other reasons. Gau dates are fed to the livestock and sold on the market for a low price.

The sample fruits are very small (about 1.5 centimeters long and 1 centimeter wide) and light. Their colour varies from light yellow to yellowish red. Gau trees often consist of a clump of shoots from the same root which is called Bu'rah (بؤرة) or Hufrah (حفرة).

=== Karmush (كرموش) ===
Any tasteless date variety that has become dry while still being attached to the fruit bunch is called Karmush. Similar to Gau fruits Karmush dates are used as fodder.

== Meals and beverages ==
The date fruit is nutritious, sweet and can easily be stored all year long. The Manasir believe that human beings can survive for years if they just have enough dates and water. The Bedouin Manasir alternatively call dates al-Zad al-negidh (الزاد النجيض) with the meaning of "the 'real' food for travelling".

Dry dates are washed, moistened in water and offered in-between and following the two daily meals. Date fruits constitute the traditional substitute for sugar and are consumed with tea.

The Manasir kitchen also uses dates for the following dishes:

- Madidah Balah (مديدة بلح) is a date pudding. The dates are boiled until they thicken and subsequently are let to cool. Butter can be added on top.
- Kurasah al-Balah (كراسة البلح) is a simple dish that consists of the traditional fresh bread called Kurasah topped with small pieces of dates. It can be kept for a few days and is used by the Bedouin Manasir as a sweat bread for travel.
- 'Barbur' (بربور) is the traditional diet for women during the first three days after having given birth. No other meals are allowed in order to "let the blood out". Pieces of dried dates are boiled in water until they develop a consistency between pudding and soup.

During festivals alcoholic beverages made from dates have been consumed traditionally:

- Sharbut (شربوت) is a common date wine. The dates are soaked in water and are fermented in a closed up Sir (cf. Material Culture of the Manasir) for three to fifteen days.
- Nabid (نبيد): The Nabid is a stronger variety of Sharbut. A handful of sorghum grains that have just reached the stage of sprouting are dried in the sun and added to the young Sharbut as a substitute for yeast.
- Baqaniah (بقنية) is a date beer. Small dried sprouting seeds of sorghum are mixed with dates and are laid out on a watered Birsh (cf. Material Culture of the Manasir). After a couple of days the Birsh is strained and the resulting liquid is cooled in a Sir. The drink is considered halaal (حلال) and given to ailing old people.

== See also ==
- Material culture of the Manasir
- Manasir people
- Dar al-Manasir
