= Manasir =

Ethnic group in Sudan

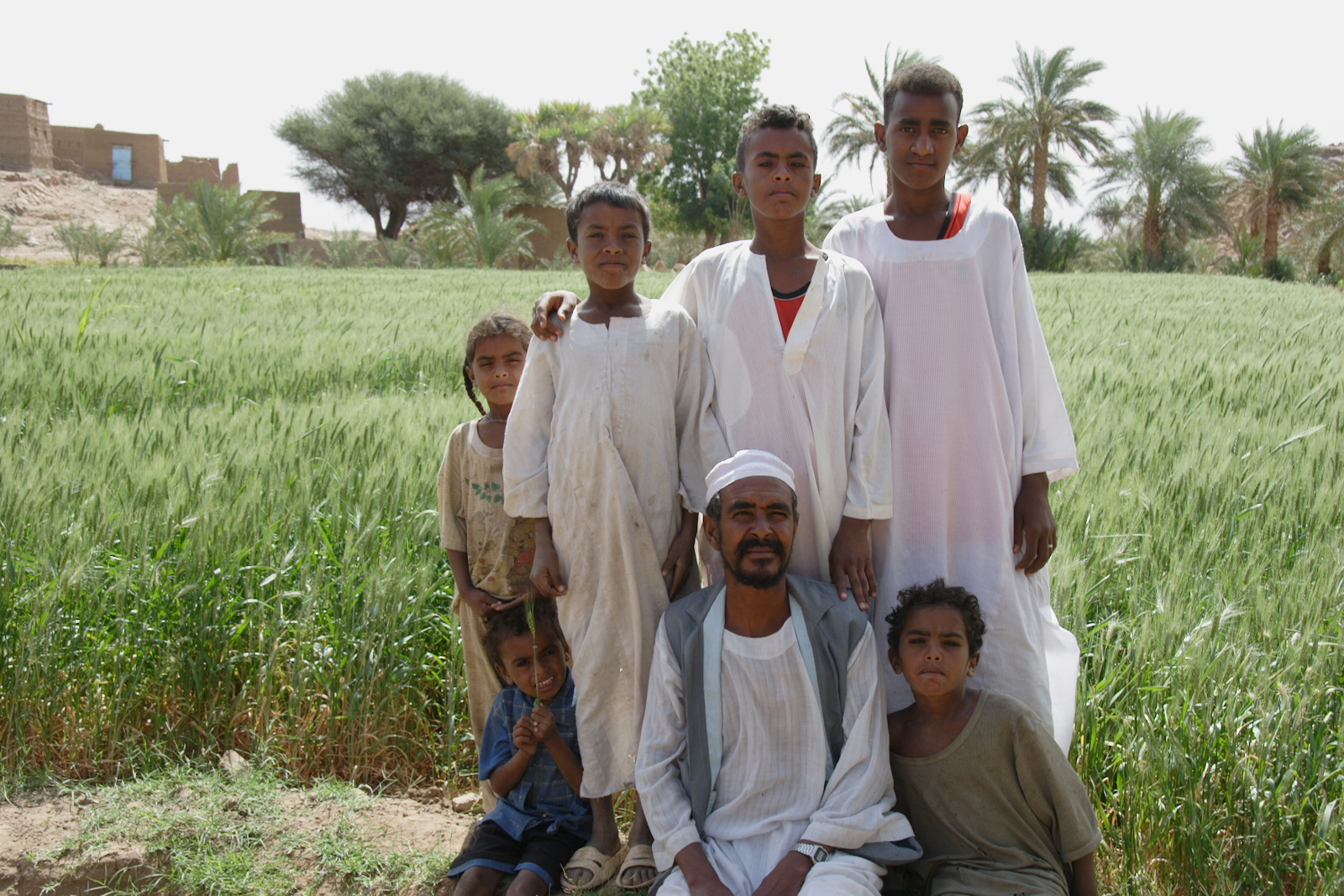
- A family from the Manasir tribe
- Ethnicity: Sudanese Arabs
- Location: Dar al-Manasir and Bayuda Desert
- Population: 80,000
- Language: Sudanese Arabic
- Religion: Sunni Islam

The Manasir or Monasir (Arabic: المناصير, romanized: al-Manāṣīr) are a Sudanese Arab tribe living in northern Sudan. Until the completion of the Merowe Dam in 2009 they inhabited the Fourth Cataract region along the Nile, which they called Dar al-Manasir. Similar to the upstream Rubatab and the downstream Shaigiya the Manasir are an indigenous Nile culture who adopted Islam and speak Arabic as their first language. Unlike other riverine tribes of Sudan, a considerable part of their population lives as seasonal Bedouins in the adjacent Bayuda Desert.

== Origin ==
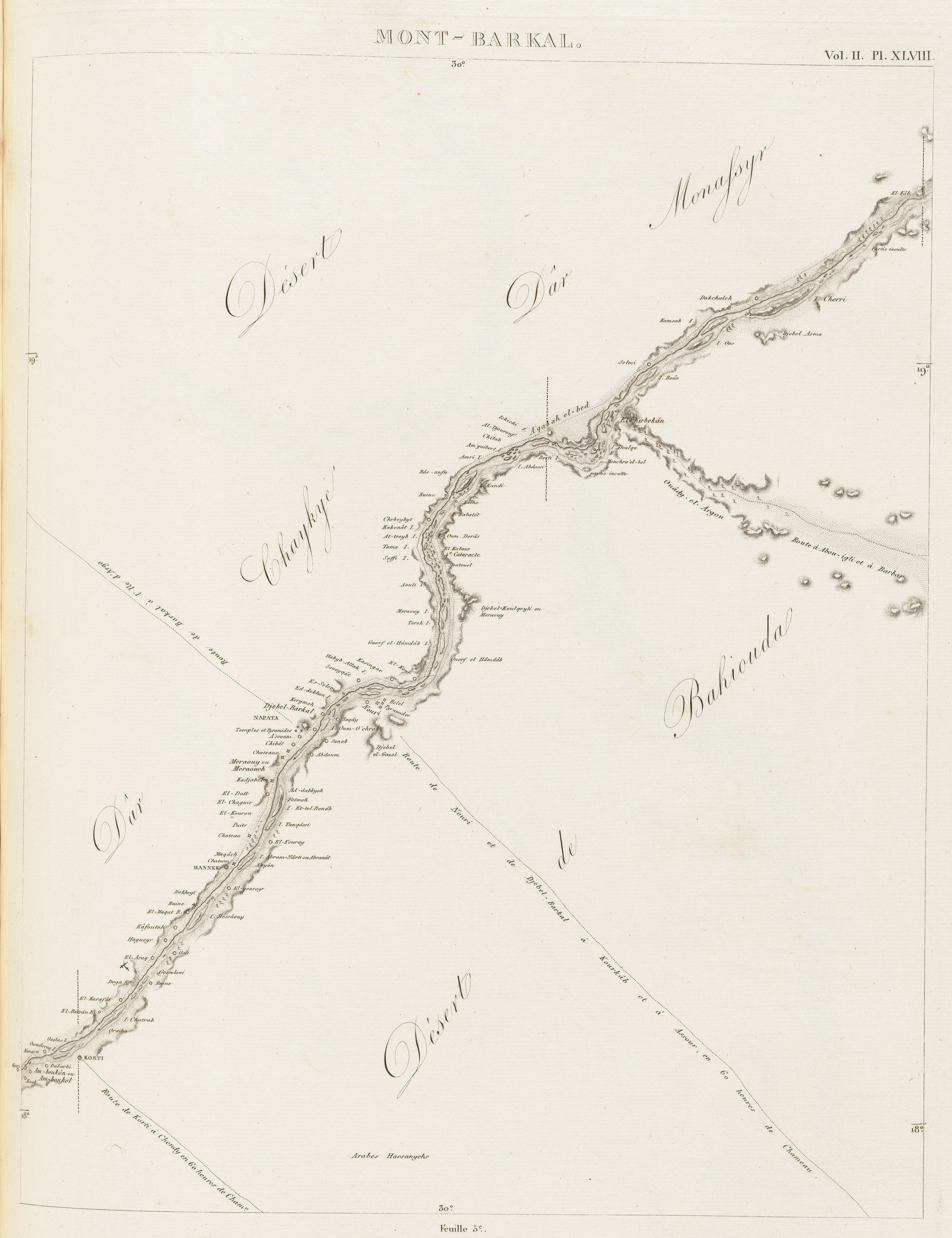
Map of Dar Manasir and Dar Shaigiya by Frederic Cailliaud, who accompanied the Turkish invasion of Sudan in 1820-1821

In literature the Manasir have traditionally been classified as being part of the Ja'alin federation, which encompasses several related Arab tribes (often described as "arabized Nubians") between Merowe in the north and Shendi in the south. Recently compiled Manasiri traditions disagree on the notion of a relationship with the Ja'alin. They also do not trace their origin to an eponymous Arab ancestor. Instead the Manasir are named after an unidentifiable locality in Egypt called al-Jazira al-Manusiryya ("the island of the victorious one"). Furthermore they are by definition not a single tribe but rather a loose federation of various clans of heterogenous origin, the perhaps most prominent being the Wahabab.

Virtually all clans of the Manasir are said to descend from migrants. The only local component of the Manasir are the nuba, or Nubians. The first foreigners who arrived was the later royal class, the muluk ("kings"). Some traditions assert that the muluk were Ja'alin, others that they came from downstream the Nile, possibly even being Nubians themselves. After arriving in Dar al-Manasir they defeated the local Nubians and turned them into their serfs. The Manasir speak Arabic and already did so in the 19th century. Only ethnolgist Robert Hartmann claimed that the Manasir were still bilingual in Arabic and Dongolawi Nubian.

== Population ==
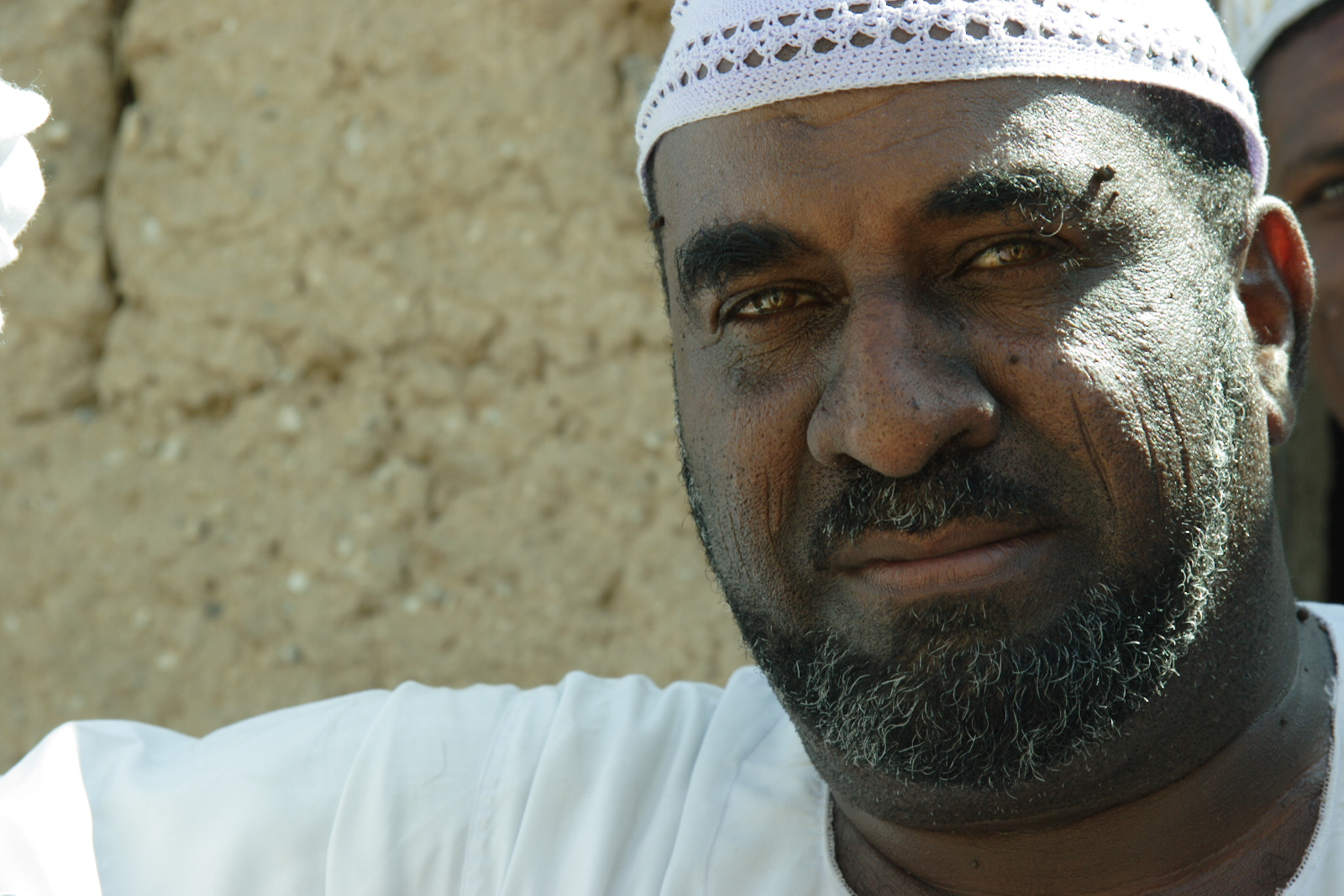
Vertical tribal marks in Suq Salamat

The de facto population of the Manasir (in the Shiri Rural Council) in 1993 had been 30,000, according to data of The Federal Department of Statistics of Sudan cited and empirically verified by SALIH (1999:10-11). The publication of the Manasir committee is talking about 33,000 residents and 17,000 non-resident Manasir (تعداد السكان المقيمين فى 92/1993 م=33.000 نسمة, تعداد الاسر المترددة فى92/1993 م=17.000 نسمة), (LAGNAH 2005:6).

Both figures remain vague and do not specify to what extent they include the Bedouin Manasir in the Bayudah Desert.

== Tribal marks ==
Like other tribes in Sudan, most Manasir of the grown-up generations have tribal marks (Shilukh, الشلوخ) which possibly originate from a Sheikh's animal burning mark (Wasm, وسم). The tribal marks are cut with a razor on the cheeks of a child to mark it belonging to a specific tribe. Among the Dongolawi and the Shaiqiya these marks usually consist of three horizontal scars, among the Rubatab and the Ja'alin the lines are vertical, the scars in the case of the Rubatab being rather larger and closer together (cf. CROWFOOT 131–132). The Manasir do not have a unique design of tribal marks, but copy either the upstream or downstream neighbouring tribes.

== Economy and culture ==
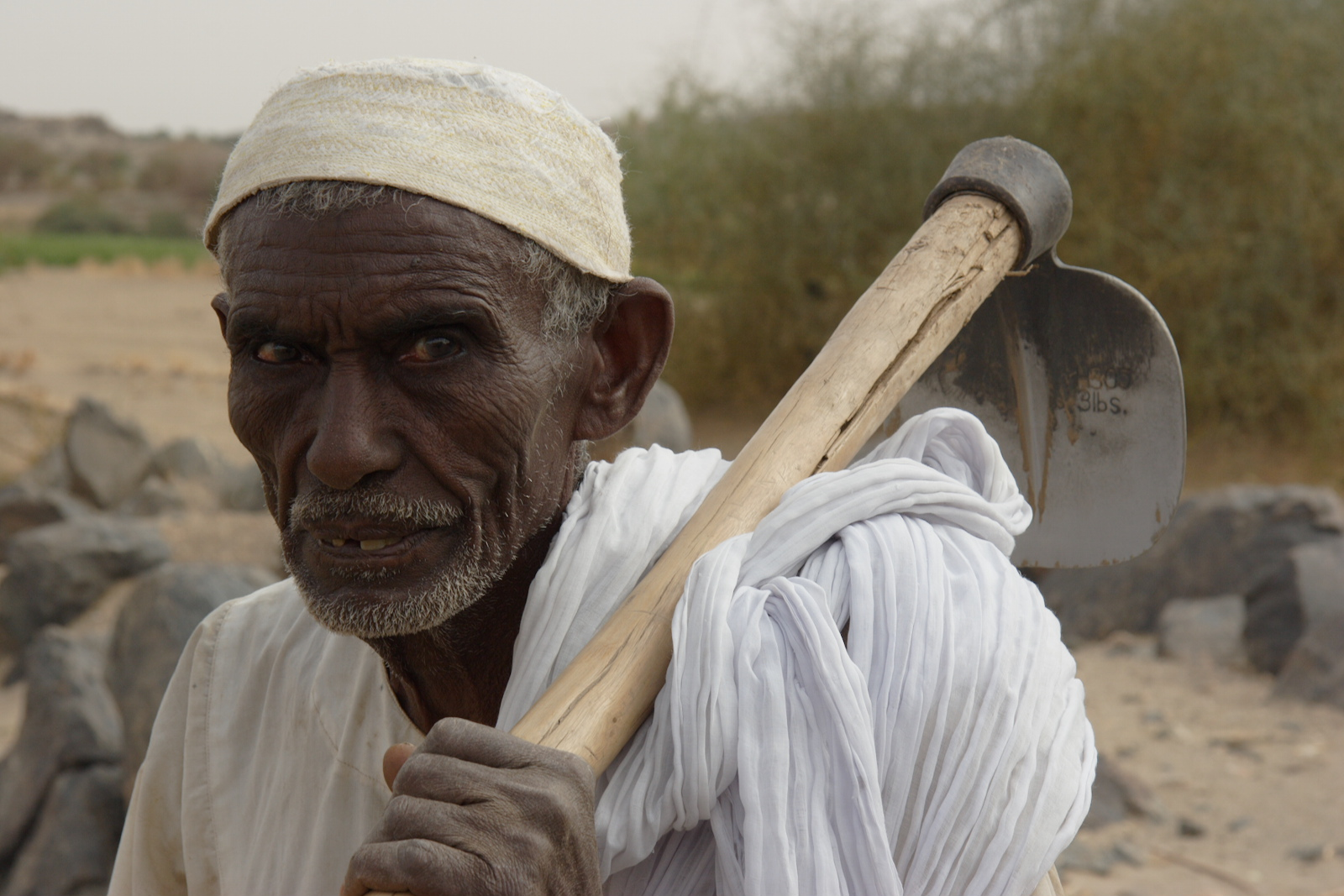
Manasir farmer with a turiah over his shoulder

The riverain Manasir pursue small scale agriculture on alluvial soils in the immediate vicinity of the Nile. Their most important cash crop sold on the national market is a wide variety of dates (cf. Date Cultivation in Dar al-Manasir). They are also renowned for their skill in building mud houses (Galus, جالوص) and they used to float wood from the region of Atbarah (cf. TAIYEB 1969:3, SALIH 1999:152).

Their material culture is simple and consists mainly of a variety of storage containers and tools (cf. Material Culture of the Manasir). An insight into their culture and perception can be obtained by studying the Diwan of their recent poet Ibrahim 'Ali Salman.

Many Manasir live as seasonal nomads. Their nomadic life of herding their stock of goats, sheep and camels in desert valleys is however limited for many to the rainy season, coinciding with the annual inundation of the Nile.

== Literature ==
- Cavendish, M. W. (1966): "The Custom of Placing Pebbles on Nubian Graves". In: Sudan Notes and Records, Vol.47, pp. 151–156.
- Crowfoot, J. W. (1918): "Customs of the Rubatab". In: Sudan Notes and Records, Vol.1, pp. 119–134.
- Gerhards, Gabriel (2023). "Präarabische Sprachen der Ja'aliyin und Ababde in der europäischen Literatur des 19. Jahrhunderts". Der Antike Sudan (in German). 34. Sudanarchäologische Gesellschaft zu Berlin e.V: 135–152.
- Hashim, M. Jalal (2023). "The Oral History of the Manāṣīr". In Derek Welsby (ed.). Archaeology by the Fourth Nile Cataract: Survey and Excavations on the Left Bank of the River and on the Islands Between Amri and Kirbekan. Vol. 1. Sudan Archaeological Research Society. Archaeopress Publishing.
- Innes, N. McL. (1930): "The Monasir Country". In: Sudan Notes and Records, Vol.14, pp. 185–191.
- Lagnah al-Tanfidhiyah lil-Muta'thirin (2005): Khasan al-Hamdab wa Qissah Tahgir Ahali al-Manasir. 20 p. (اللجنة التنفيذية للمتأثرين (2005): خزان الحامداب و قصة تهجير أهالي المناصير)
- Qasim, 'A. al-Sh. (2002): Qamus al-Lahgah al-'Amiya fi al-Sudan. 3rd ed. 1076 p. (عون الشريف قاسم (2002): قاموس اللهجة العامية في السودان. الطبعة الثالثة. الدار السودانية للكتب)
- Salih, A. M. (1999): The Manasir of the Northern Sudan: Land and People. A Riverain Society and Resource Scarcity. 282 p.
- Taiyeb, M. al-T. et al. (1969): Al-Turath al-Sha'ibi li-Qabilah al-Manasir. Salsalah Dirasat fi al-Turath al-Sudani. Khartoum University Faculty of Adab. 155 p. (الطيب محمد الطيب و عبد السلام سليمان و علي سعد (1969): التراث الشعبي لقبيلة المناصير. سلسلة دراسات في التراث السوداني, جامعة الخرطوم, كلية الآداب )
