= Rubatab tribe =

Arab tribe in northern Sudan

Rubatab
- Ethnicity: Sudanese Arabs
- Location: Nile river basin between Sinqayr and Shamkhiyya
- Population: 60,000
- Language: Sudanese Arabic
- Religion: Islam

The Rubatab people (Arabic: الرباطاب, romanized: ar-rubāṭāb) constitute one of many riverine tribes of Northern Sudan. They inhabit the region of the Fourth Cataract of the Nile, roughly equating to the Abu Hamad District. Similar to their neighbouring tribes, the mid-stream Manasir and the downstream Shaiqiyah (الشايقيّة), the Rubatab are an Arab tribe in the Northeastern Sudan, with an archaic Arabic mother tongue. Their tribal homeland traditionally stretches north of Berber, Sudan until the town of Abu Hamad. The Rubatab border the Ababda people, the Bishari tribe, and the Manasir.

The Rubatab, a group consisting of around 60,000 people in 2012, are a sub-group of the Ja'alin tribe, one of the three prominent Sudanese Arab tribes in northern Sudan. Like the Ja'alin, they consider themselves Arab, even though various scholars have classified the Ja'alin as a "Afro-Arab hybrid", a mix of "the indigenous Africans and the Arabs who came to the Sudan between the 9th and the 14th centuries " Earlier Western scholars have used various phrases to describe this mix--"as having bastardized Arab blood, paganized Islam, and creolized Arabic".

== History and customs ==
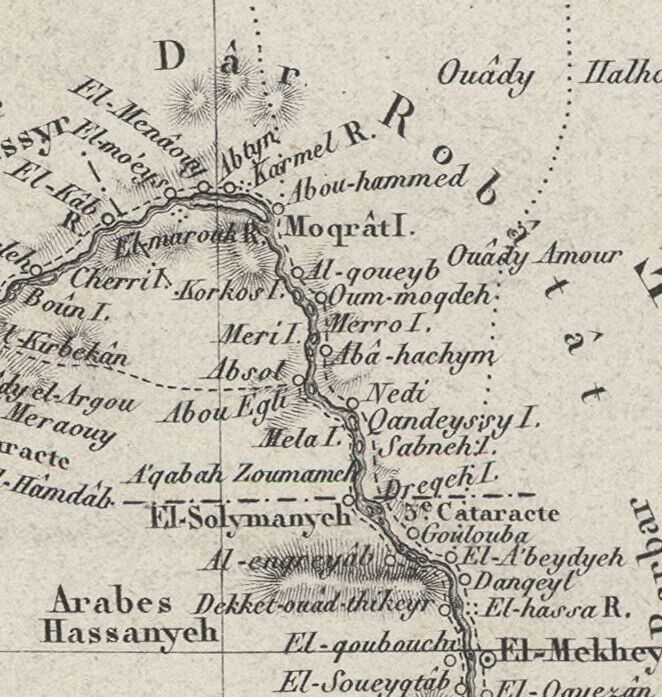
Dar Rubatab ("Robâtât") on a map by Frederic Cailliaud, who visited the area in 1821

In a 1918 article published in the Sudan Notes and Records, British administrator and archeologist John Winter Crowfoot translated a description of the tribe's history and customs sent to him by a Rubatab sheik. He described the land his people lived on as poor and barren, and their food and clothing as austere. Inheritances are shared among the heirs, and each family keeps a genealogy. Education is only for the children of religious families. Wives are in charge of the household, and husbands may not beat their wives, though her guardian may. Polygamy is practiced; Adulterous women have to prove their innocence by holding a red-hot poker, and may be killed (by their guardian) if their hands are burned, which is proof of their guilt. Clans believe in various walis, whom they bring offerings particularly at the various stages of a child's maturation--head shaving, circumcision, marriage. Belief in houris is also widespread: they are said to have "white skins and long flowing hair and live in the river", from which they sometimes emerge to drag men into the Nile river where they have underwater villages.

They further believe, according to the sheik, that

a Wali can swallow his enemy flesh and bones, one of the Walis being called Fiki Suliman Balla' el Rijãl: and that another, called Fiki 'ljal, orders a hippopotamus to come out of the river and turn his Sakia like a bull; when the hippopotamus refuses to work, he beats it with a wooden sword one cubit long and it turns the wheel at once.

Marriage customs, according to the sheik, dictate that typically a girl marry the son of her paternal uncle, regardless of age or wealth, and if he dies she has to marry her dead husband's next of kin or lose her inheritance. Fathers decide on marriages, and the bride's mother's consent is necessarily only if the bridegroom is a stranger. The groom's mother has to provide a dowry, the mahr and the tu'ma; the former was typically land and date trees, the latter money given to the father of the bride. Weddings are village feasts that include dancing and children playing. This communal feast is preceded by an elaborate gift giving ceremony and the singing of a song called the Sumar, which praises the virtues of the bridegroom and his family. A wedding contract is drawn up and read in public.

A note by " A. J. C. H." claims to have heard a story that explains why the Rubatab occupy the worst land in the district. Once upon a time, all the land between Khartoum and Dongola was owned by a sheik who had five sons, and before he died he pleaded with them to not have any quarrels between them. The oldest son, Robat, called all the brothers together to divide their dead father's land, and said, "1 am the eldest and I will set you an example that we may all live together in peace as our father wished. I will take first choice and will choose the rocky lands south of Abu Hamed"--the current dry and hard land of the Rubatab.
