= Dar al-Manasir =

Coordinates: 18°59′N 32°25′E

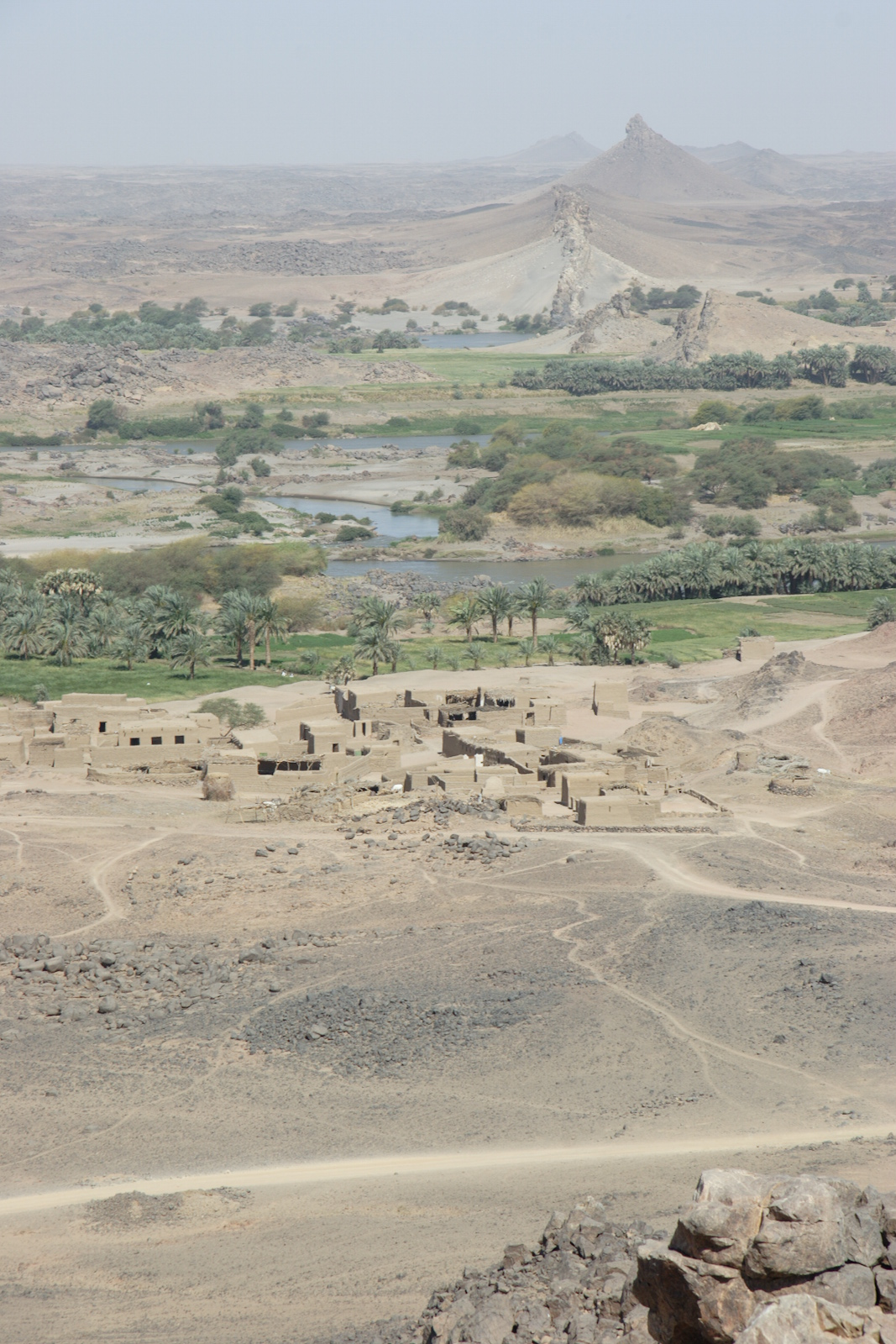
Dar al-Manasir as seen from the top of Gebel Musa

Dar al-Manasir (Arabic: دار المناصير) is the region of the Fourth Cataract, the most impassable of all rapids of the Nile. It is the homeland of the Arab tribe of the Manasir and from them gets its name. Still today the water rapids cannot be crossed by any large boats making the region accessible only via a sandy and rocky desert track.

At the height of the Island of Muqrat (N 19°30') the Nile river is blocked from its northward course taking a sharp turn SSW for 280 kilometres before continuing to flow north. In the middle of this S-shape between the Bayudah Desert to the south and the Nubian Desert to the north, the Nile is forced by the topography to split up into a multitude of tributaries forming a fertile river oasis of small rocky islands described by the traveller Gray (1949:120) with the following words: "Whereas usually [agriculture] in the Nile Valley […] is confined to the belt on two banks on which the river has deposited silt, in this cataract area, where islands are scattered like a flock of goats, the number of silt-covered river banks in any given 10 kilometres may be up to a dozen".

Dar al-Manasir will be successively flooded by the Merowe Dam project.

== Extent ==
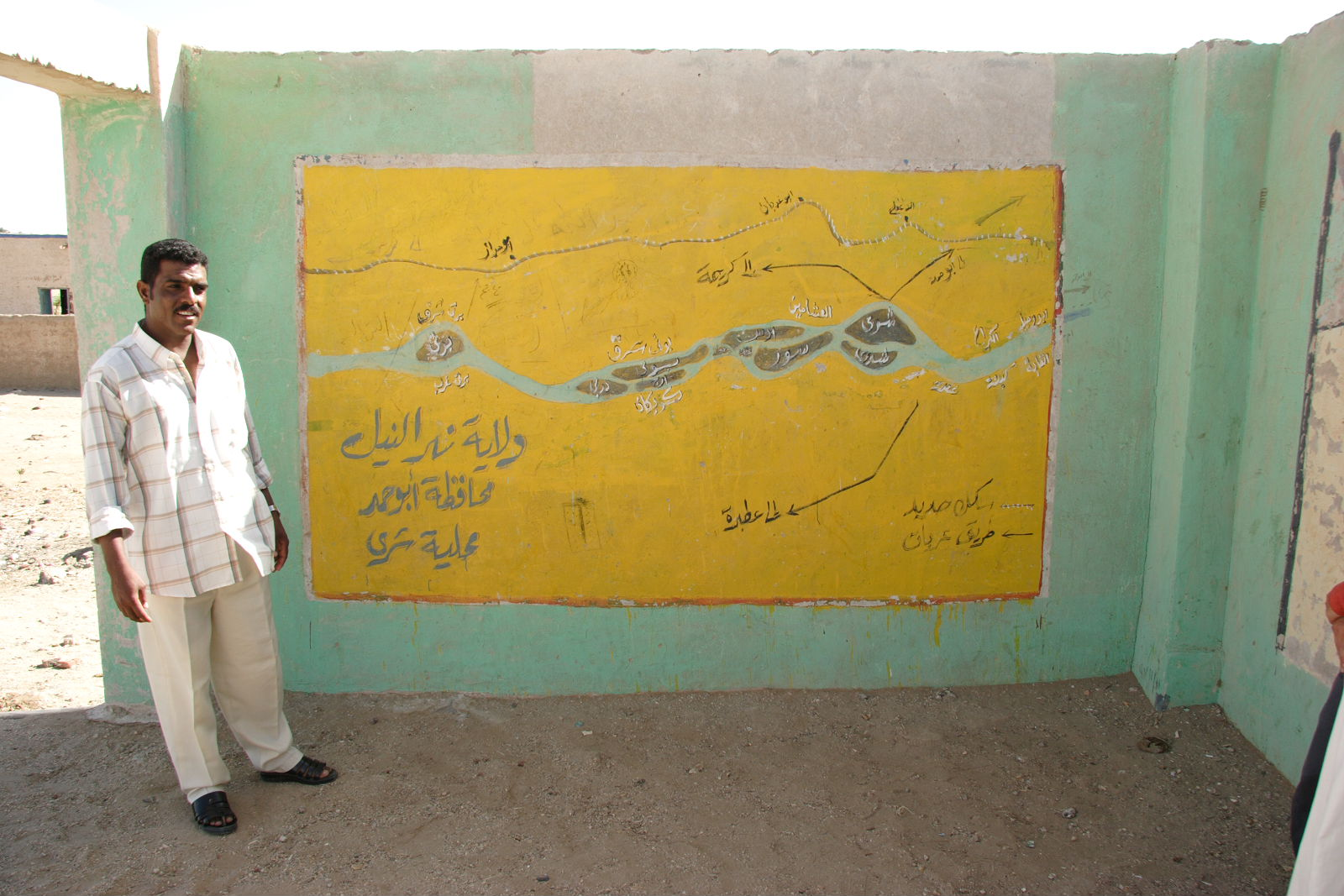
The local map of Dar al-Manasir in Shiri

Dar al-Manasir is confined by the upstream living Rubatab tribe (الرباطاب) in the area of Abu Hamed (أبو حمد) (E 33.18°) and the downstream Shaiqiyah tribe (الشايقية) past the village of Birti (E 32.15°), (cf. LAGNAH 2005:2). Dar al-Manasir is covering a distance of approximately 130 km along the Nile with most villages lined up along the left river bank called "Western side" (…). But the heart of Dar al-Manasir consists of 14 islands, twelve of them permanently inhabited; al-Qanaweit (القناويت), Shiri (شري), Kidir (كدر), Sherari (شرري), Sur (سور), Us (اوز), Tibit (…), Dumag (دماج), Buni (بوني), Arag (ارج), Dirbi (دربي) and Birti (برتي), (cf. SALIH 1999:8, LAGNAH 2005:2).

== Climate ==
View over Marha, Sur Island in Dar al-Manasir

The climate is arid with an annual rainfall of about 50 mm in good years. The exact amount and spatial distribution of the precipitation during the rainy season in the months of August until October is highly variable and therefore unpredictable. The rainy season coincides with the flood season of the Nile (cf. SALIH 1999:9).

== Economy ==
Dar al-Manasir as seen from the top of Gebel Us

The Manasir pursue small scale agriculture in the immediate vicinity of the Nile. Tiny pockets of alluvial sediments and the seasonally inundated riverside land are intensively irrigated and cultivated. The most important cash crops of the region are dates (cf. Date cultivation in Dar al-Manasir). During good rainy seasons, in which grazing grounds are abundant, many male Manasir join members of their tribe in the adjacent Bayudah Desert.

== Administration ==
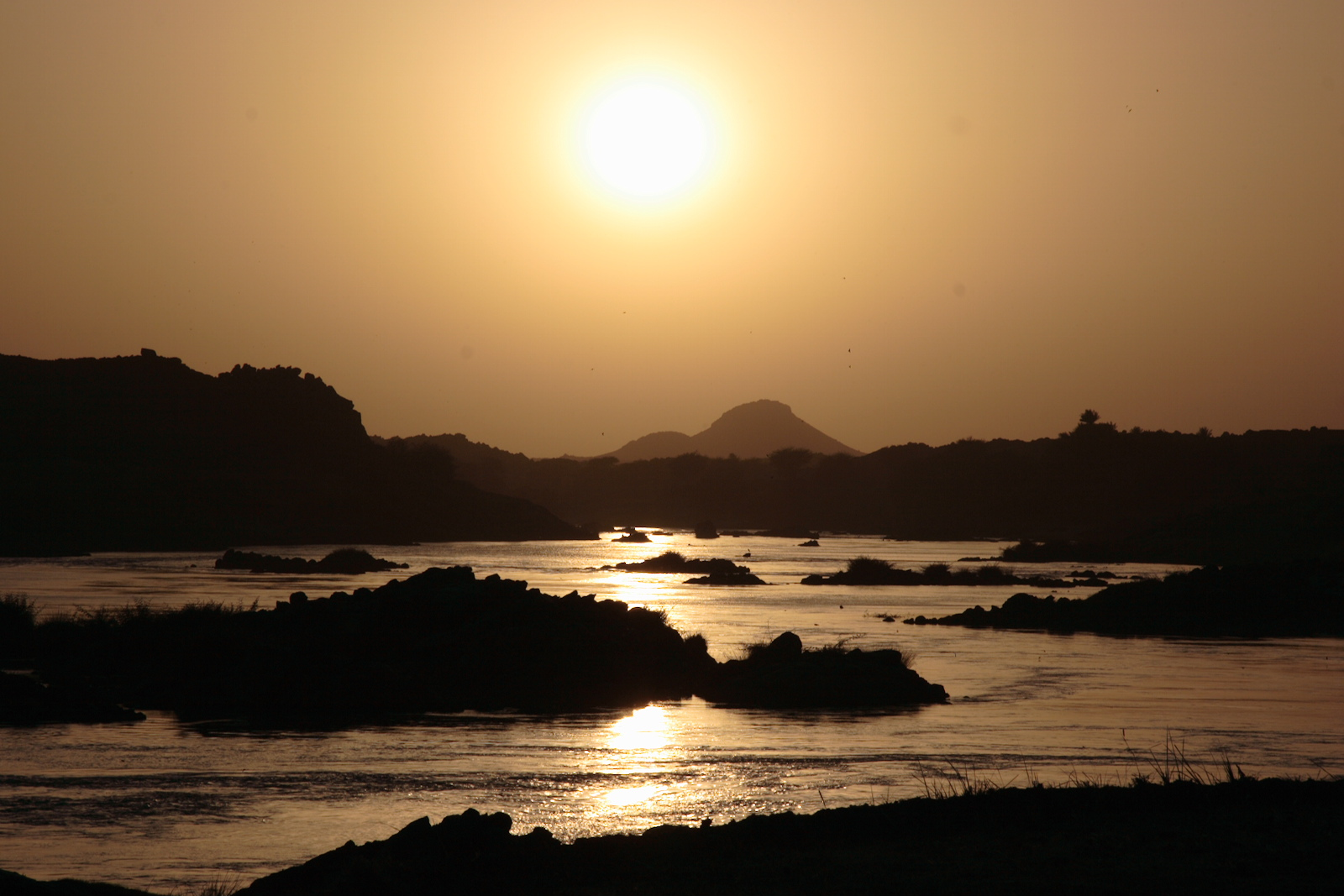
Sunset over Dar al-Manasir

Politically Dar al-Manasir belongs to the River Nile state (ولاية نهر النيل Wilāya nahr an-Nīl). The administrative centre with the only local run police station, branch of the Agricultural Bank and Secondary Schools for both sexes is Shiri (شري) on Shiri Island.

Dar al-Manasir is one of the least developed areas in Northern Sudan. Apart from basic educational institutions virtually no public infrastructure such as tarred roads, bridges or ferry boats and hospitals exist. But the Manasir also recognize advantages of this situation, describing them as exceptional safety and honesty (في أمان), tranquillity (الجوّ هادئ و نظيف), untainted beauty of their country (البلد سمح) and cleanliness of the water which they drink from the Nile. The landscape, described by Innes (1931:184) as "most barren and the most beautiful" along the Nile, is simply referred to by the inhabitants as "our rocks" (حجرنا).

Dar al-Manasir villages and agricultural land were flooded in 2008 when the floodgates of the Merowe Dam were closed. The reservoir spans 170 kilometers and caused the displacement of several local tribes. The area's residents were forced to move to resettlement villages established by the Sudanese Government. 60% of the Manasir refused to move so they could stay near the fertile land of the lake, but the other 40% in less fertile areas were displaced to Al-Makabrab and Kehila.

== See also ==
- Date cultivation in Dar al-Manasir

== Related books ==
- Bashir, al-N. T. al-S. (ed.), (1997): Diwan 'Abqariah al-Manasir. Li-Ustadh Ibrahim 'Ali al-Sha'ir. 189 p. (النذير تاج السر البشير(جمع وإعداد), (1997): ديوان عبقرية المناصير. للأستاذ إبراهيم علي الشاعر)
- Qasim, 'A. al-Sh. (2002): Qamus al-Lahgah al-'Amiya fi al-Sudan, 3rd ed. 1076 p. (عون الشريف قاسم (2002): قاموس اللهجة العامية في السودان. الطبعة الثالثة. الدار السودانية للكتب)
- Salih, A. M. (1999): The Manasir of the Northern Sudan: Land and People. A Riverain Society and Resource Scarcity. 282 p.
- Taiyeb, M. Al-T. et al. (1969): Al-Turath al-Sha'ibi li-Qabilah al-Manasir. Salsalah Dirasat fi al-Turath al-Sudani. Khartoum University Faculty of Adab. 155 p. (الطيب محمد الطيب و عبد السلام سليمان و علي سعد (1969): التراث الشعبي لقبيلة المناصير. سلسلة دراسات في التراث السوداني, جامعة الخرطوم, كلية الآداب)
- Yusif, A.A. (1995): Al-Nakhil (First Part), Khartoum. 349 p. (عبدلله أحمد يوسف (1995): النخيل – الجزء الأولى الخرطوم)
