= Kajbar =

Kajbar Kⲁⳝⲃⲁⲣ
- Location of Kajbar in Sudan
- Coordinates: 19°57′0″N 30°32′0″E
- Country: Sudan
- State: Northern
- Time zone: UTC+2 (CAT)

Kajbar (Nobiin: Kⲁⳝⲃⲁⲣ Arabic: كجبار) is a village in Northern State, Sudan. It is the largest village in the Mahas region in terms of both population and land area, extending at least 5 kilometers (3.1 mi) along the banks of the Nile.

== Etymology ==
The origin of the name "Kajbar" is a subject of local debate. One popular theory suggests it is a compound of two words: Kaj and Bar. In the Nobiin language, Kaj means "donkey," while in the Dongolawi language, it means "horse." Bar refers to a "tethering post" or "stable," making the name translate to "The Horse (or Donkey) Stable."

== Geography ==
Kajbar is located in the Northern State of Sudan. It is administratively part of the Delgo Rural Council within the Wadi Halfa district. It is bordered to the south by the village of Dafoy and to the north by the village of Koka. Kajbar is situated near the Third Cataract of the Nile.

== History ==
The village became a focal point of national and international attention due to the Sudanese government's proposal to construct the Kajbar Dam, a 360 MW hydroelectric project.

In June 2007, the village was the site of the Kajbar Massacre, where security forces opened fire on peaceful protesters opposing the dam, resulting in the deaths of four individuals. Activists and local residents opposed the project because it threatened to flood approximately 90 villages, displace 10,000 people, and submerge over 500 ancient Nubian archaeological sites. In 2021, the Sudanese transitional government formally announced the cancellation of the Kajbar and Dal dam projects in response to years of community resistance.
