= Kokka, Sudan =

Village in Northern State, Sudan

Kokka Ⲕⲟⲩⲕⲕⲁ
- Village
- Location of Kokka in Sudan
- Coordinates: 20.01°N 30.58°E
- Country: Sudan
- State: Northern
- Time zone: UTC+2 (CAT)

Kokka or Koka (Nobiin: Ⲕⲟⲩⲕⲕⲁ; Arabic: كوكا) is a village in Northern State, Sudan, located on the western bank of the Nile River near the Third Cataract. Kokka is part of the Delgo locality.

== Toponomy ==
The name Kokka (Nobiin pronunciation: [kʊkka]) means 'retreated' or 'secluded' because the village sits in a low-lying area surrounded by higher ground.

== History ==
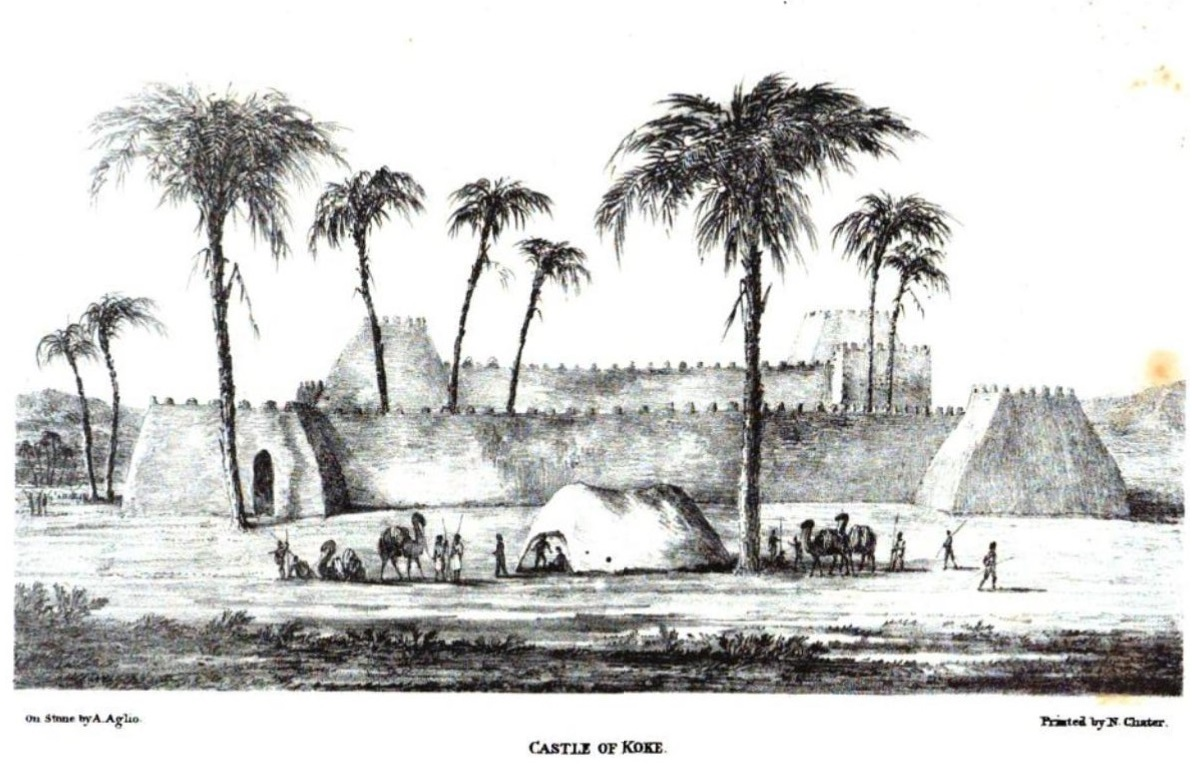
Drawing of Kokka castle, 1822.

A locality called Kokka (Old Nubian: Ⲕⲟⲕⲕⲁ) appears in two medieval documents from Qasr Ibrim. In the post-medieval period Kokka was the capital of a petty kingdom wedged between the Ottoman Empire in the north and the Funj Sultanate in the south. This kingdom was divided into seven districts stretching from Wawa in the north to Fogo in the south. According to local traditions it had 13 kings, with the last one being Abdel Aziz bin Subeir bin Diab, who was deposed in 1912.

== Geography ==
Kokka is situated in the Mahas region, southwest of Delgo. It is bordered to the south by Kajbar, to the north by El Turaa, and to the east by Kadrama. Both banks of the Nile are lined with date palm trees that separate it from the residential settlements.
