= Kajbar massacre =

Massacre in Northern State, Sudan, in 2007

- Memorial being erected at the site of the massacre
- Date: 13 June 2007
- Location: Kajbar
- Caused by: Opposition to the proposed Kajbar Dam, which would have flooded the Third Cataract region and displaced the Mahas community
- Goals: Stop construction of the Kajbar Dam
- Methods: Protests
- Result: 4 protesters killed, over 15 wounded, and 26 detained

The Kajbar massacre (Arabic: مجزرة كجبار) occurred on 13 June 2007 when Sudanese security forces opened fire on a crowd of protesters at Kidintakar, a narrow passage between the Nile and mountains near the village of Sabu-Jaddi in the Kajbar area. The protesters had gathered to oppose the planned Kajbar Dam, a project that would have submerged large numbers of Nubian villages and displaced local communities in the Mahas region. Four protesters were killed, more than fifteen were wounded, and more than twenty, among them journalists, were detained after the shooting.

== Background ==
Kajbar lies on the Nile at the Third Cataract. The proposed Kajbar Dam is a hydropower and irrigation project. Local communities argued that the project would flood many villages, and forcibly displace residents, roughly 10,000 people. The Association of Nubians living in northern Sudan warned that the construction of the two dams will wipe out more than 7,000 years of Nubian civilisation.

Longstanding resistance to the dam led to regular protests by residents and organized committees against the project. On 13 June 2007, locals organized a peaceful march that started in the village of Fareig and headed downriver toward the Third Cataract. The march was intercepted at Kidintakar (Nobiin: Ⲕⲓⲇⲓⲛⲧⲁⲕⲁⲣ), a narrow passage between the Nile and mountains, where security forces positioned on the mountain ambushed the demonstrators and opened fire with live ammunition. Four people were killed and more than fifteen were wounded, while dozens of protesters and journalists were also detained in the aftermath.

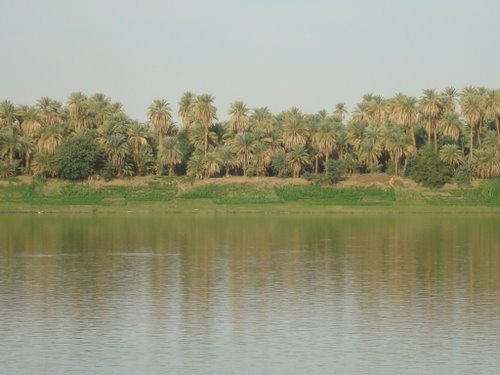
Palm groves in Northern Sudan

Communities around Kajbar also faced repeated destruction of their date palm groves, which have been central to local livelihood since ancient times. Throughout the Northern State, a series of large palm plantation fires was recorded over several years. These fires were deliberate and linked to pressure from security bodies involved in promoting the dam projects. Thousands of palm trees were burned across different localities, along with delayed or absent responses from civil defense authorities. Locals interpreted this pattern as an effort to weaken resistance to the dams by damaging agricultural income. Official explanations framed the fires as accidental or caused by environmental conditions, and the absence of independent investigations left the causes disputed in public discussion.

Following the June 2007 shooting, security services carried out arrests of activists and organizers connected with the anti dam campaign. International and regional organizations documented arrests and short term detentions, and they urged Sudanese authorities to investigate the use of force and to respect freedom of expression and assembly. Advocacy groups produced submissions and urgent appeals calling for accountability and the release of detainees. However, there's limited evidence of prosecutions of security personnel in relation to the 2007 events.

== Aftermath ==
The 2007 shooting remains a reference point for Nubian activists opposing dam projects in northern Sudan. In the aftermath of the massacre, a group called the Kush Liberation Movement (KLM) emerged. In July 2018, a memorial to the victims was unveiled at Kidintakar, at the entrance to Kidintakar mountain, during the eleventh anniversary commemoration organized by the High Committee for the Commemoration of the Martyrs of Kajbar. In April 2021, Sudanese Prime Minister Abdalla Hamdok announced the formal cancellation of the Kajbar and Dal dam projects.
