= Northern State (Sudan) =

State of Sudan

Northern State الولاية الشمالية
- State
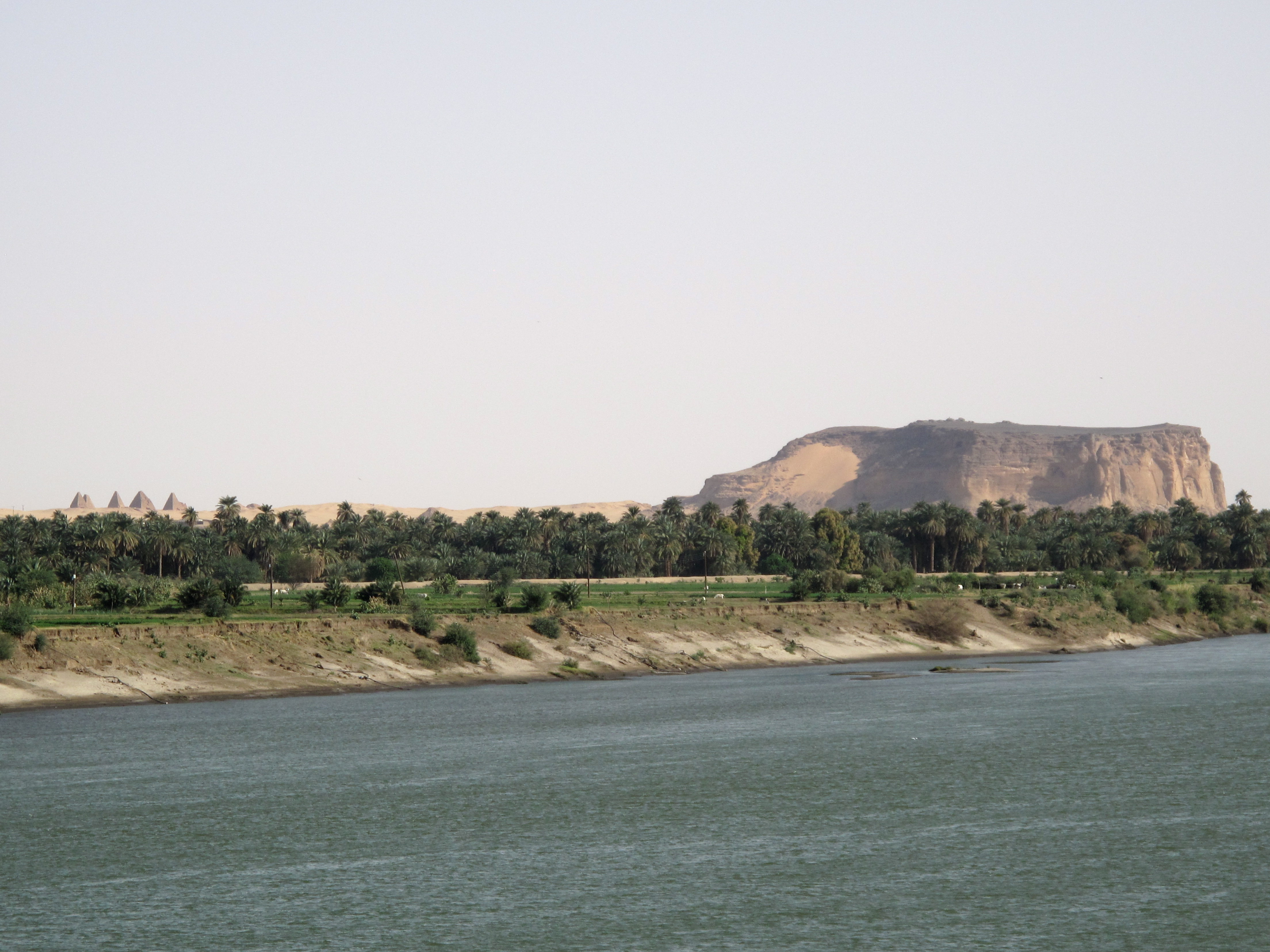
- The sandstone mesa of Jebel Barkal near Karima

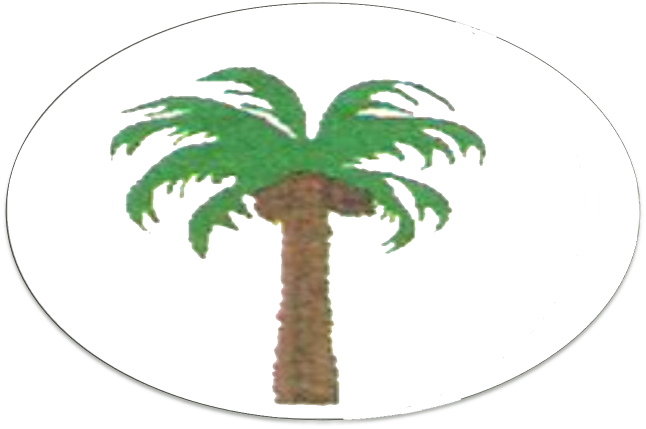
- Seal

- Location in Sudan
- Coordinates: 19°37′N 29°38′E
- Country: Sudan
- Capital: Dongola

Government
  - Governor: Abdeen Awadallah

Area
  - Total: 348,765 km^{2} (134,659 sq mi)
  - Rank: 1st
- Highest elevation (Jebel Uweinat): 1,895 m (6,217 ft)
- Lowest elevation (Lake Nubia): 183 m (600 ft)

Population (2018)
  - Total: 936,255
  - Density: 2.39/km^{2} (6.2/sq mi)
- Time zone: UTC+2 (CAT)
- ISO 3166 code: SD-NO
- GeoNames: 378389
- HDI (2023): 0.628 medium · 2nd
- Website: alshamaliastate.gov.sd

Northern State (Arabic: الشمالية, romanized: Ash Shamālīyah) is one of the 18 wilayat (states) of Sudan and the largest by area. It has an area of 348,765 km^{2} and an estimated population of 936,255. The area that comprises present-day Northern State was known in ancient times as Nubia. The territory has been part of successive ancient and medieval polities, including the Kingdom of Kush, and in the modern era the Mahdist State. The state borders Egypt to the north, River Nile State to the east, Khartoum State to the southeast, North Kordofan to the south, and North Darfur and Libya to the west. The disputed Wadi Halfa Salient is located on the border of the state and Egypt.

== Etymology ==
The name Northern State translates the Arabic Al-Wilāya al-Shamāliyya. The word wilāya means 'governorate' or 'state', while shamāliyya means 'northern'. The state was formerly known in English as the Northern Province and in Arabic as Al-Mudīrīya al-Shamāliyya, the 'Northern Directorate'. The state received its current designation in 1994 by presidential decree.

== History ==
=== Ancient History ===
In 2500 BCE, the Kingdom of Kerma was established in what is now Northern State. Kerma was one of the earliest civilizations in sub-Saharan Africa. In 1500 BCE, following the expulsion of the Hyksos, the Egyptians, under Ahmose I turned their attention south towards the Kermans, and conquered Lower Nubia. Most of Nubia was eventually colonized during the 18th Dynasty of Egypt. Lower levels of the Nile and a state of deterioration from within forced the Egyptians to withdraw from Nubia.

The power vacuum left behind by the Egyptians was exploited by the Kushites, who established their kingdom in Napata around the ninth century BCE. In the mid 8th century BCE, the Kingdom of Kush went on to conquer Egypt and occupy it for one hundred years, they also revitalized pyramid building 500 years after it had ceased to exist in Egypt. There are four pyramid sites in Northern State: Nuri, El-Kurru, Sedeinga, and Jebel Barkal.

In the 1st century BCE, Rome attempted to impose tribute on Kush. This prompted the Kushites to raid the Triacontaschoenus, and sack Syene, the Romans counterattacked, sacking Napata, the religious centre of Kush, a peace deal favoring Kush was reached between the two. Kush eventually started declining and fell in the 4th century CE.

=== Medieval period ===
In the 4th century CE, Nobatia, a Christian Nubian kingdom, was established in Lower Nubia, with its capital at Faras. Nobatia was the first Nubian polity to emerge after the fall of Kush. Nobatia eventually unified with its neighbour, Makuria. To the south of Makuria was Alodia, with its capital at Soba.

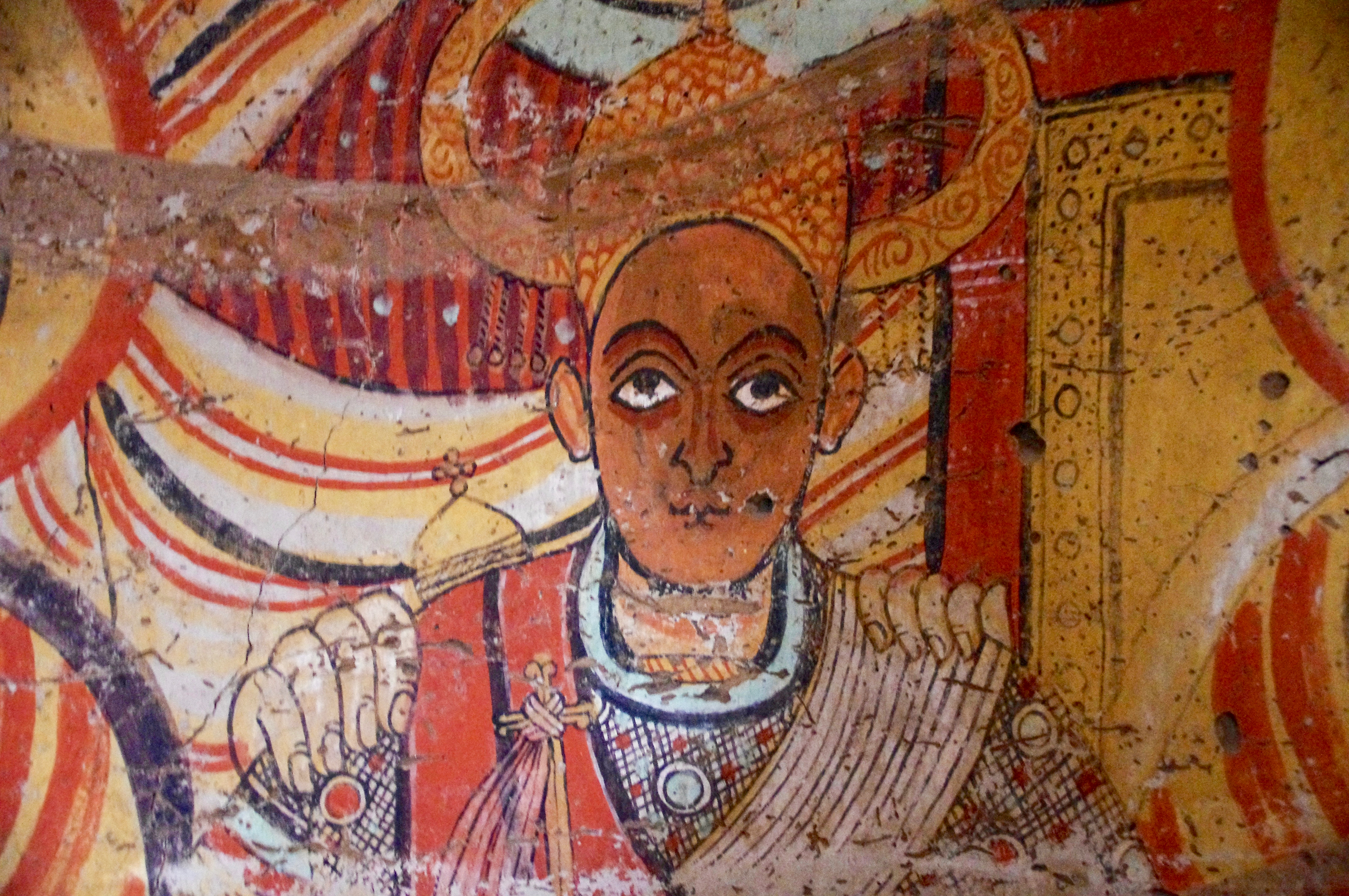
Wall painting of an unknown Makurian king from Old Dongola, late 13th–mid 14th century

In 652 CE, after successfully repulsing an invasion by the forces of the Rashidun Caliphate from newly Islamic Egypt, the Baqt, a bilateral non-aggression and trade treaty, was signed between the Kingdom of Makuria and the Rashidun Caliphate. Lasting nearly 700 years until its dissolution in the mid-14th century, the Baqt is regarded as one of the longest lasting diplomatic agreements in recorded history.

Nubia experienced a period of prosperity between the 9th and 11th centuries, with productive agriculture, and widespread literacy utilizing the Old Nubian alphabet. Architectural and artistic projects also experienced a rise during this period.

Makuria began declining in the late 12th century due to Mamluk invasions and infighting. By the late 14th century, much of the region had fragmented into smaller polities and petty kingdoms. During this period, Arab migration and intermarriage accelerated.

=== Post-medieval period and colonial rule ===
In the 16th century, parts of southeastern Northern State came under the influence of the Funj Sultanate, which extended its authority through alliances with local rulers. Meanwhile, northern areas closer to Egypt experienced periods of autonomy interspersed with foreign intervention. In 1811, Muhammad Ali invited the leading Mamluk beys to Cairo under the guise of a peace treaty and massacred them. The surviving Mamluks fled to the Dongola and Merowe regions in Northern State, They chose Maragha as their new capital, a small town that would later be known as Dongola. They exerted limited control until they were subdued by Muhammad Ali's forces during the Turco-Egyptian conquest of Sudan (1820–1824)

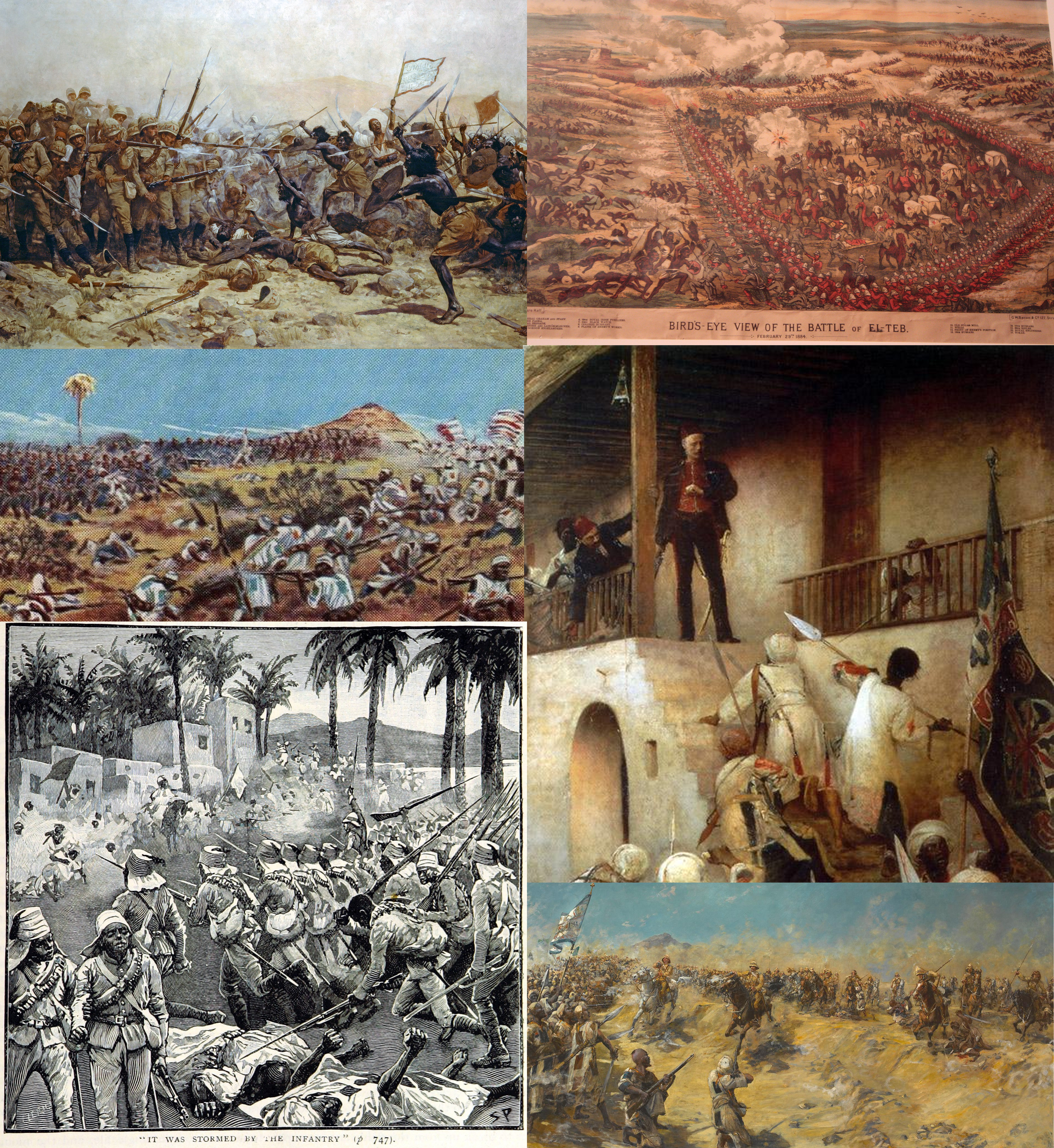
Mahdist War

In the late 19th century, the region became a theatre of the Mahdist War (1881–1899). The Mahdist forces, led by Muhammad Ahmad, gained support along the Nile, and several battles took place near Dongola. Following the defeat of the Mahdists by the Anglo-Egyptian campaign in 1898, Northern State was integrated into Anglo-Egyptian Sudan (1899–1956).

=== State of Sudan ===
Northern State was part of a province with River Nile State. The Northern Province was split into Northern State, and River Nile State in 1973. Both states received their current boundaries and designations in 1994.

In 2004 Northern State saw the construction of the Merowe Dam. The construction of the dam resulted in the forced displacement of 55,000–70,000 people, mainly from the Manasir, Hamadab and Amri communities. Proposals for Kajbar Dam prompted a UN expert to raise similar concerns about displacement of local populations. In June 2007, security forces opened fire on demonstrators opposing the project, an event known as the Kajbar massacre. In 2021 the government formally cancelled the Kajbar and Dal dam projects.

==== Sudanese civil war (2023–present) ====
On 15 April 2023, one of the earliest battles of the civil war occurred in Northern State, the Rapid Support Forces (RSF) fought Sudanese and Egyptian forces in the town of Merowe and were defeated, withdrawing toward Khartoum. Their withdrawal ended ground combat in the populated parts of the state, but the border triangle with Libya and Egypt still remains contested. Northern State has been subject to drone strikes by the RSF since late 2024. One strike in October 2025 killed five civilians and injured others, strikes on the Merowe dam also caused widespread electricity outages in the state and in other parts of Sudan. Northern state hosts 210,000 displaced people from Darfur and Kordofan.

== Geography ==
View of Jebel Uweinat from space

Northern State lies in the far north of Sudan, stretching from the Egyptian border to the Fourth Cataract. The Nile flows through the state from south to north for a length of 650 km (400 mi). It borders Egypt to the north, River Nile State to the east, Khartoum State to the southeast, and North Darfur, Libya, and North Kordofan to the south and west. Jebel Uweinat, a mountain range on the Egyptian-Libyan-Sudanese tripoint, is located on the northwest edge of the state.

The state's geography divides into two main physical zones: the narrow Nile floodplain, and the surrounding desert regions. To the east of the Nile is the Nubian Desert, and to the west lies the Libyan Desert. These desert areas are primarily rocky or stony, with occasional sand dunes, and receive very little rainfall.

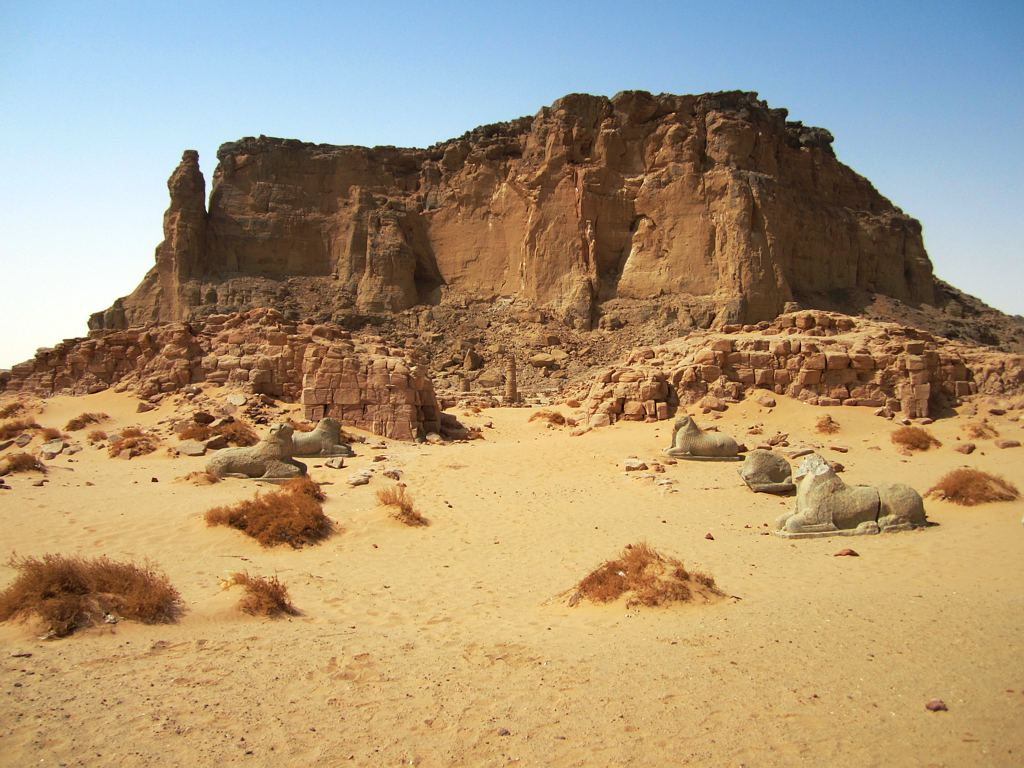
View of Jebel Barkal

The Nubian Desert is characterized by a sandstone plateau crossed by seasonal wadis that generally do not reach the Nile. These wadis flow only after rare rainstorms and then quickly disappear, as the climate is arid, with very low and irregular precipitation, especially in the interior away from the river.

A geographic landmark in the state is Jebel Barkal, a sandstone mesa near Karima, recognized as a UNESCO World Heritage Site in 2003.

=== Climate ===
Northern State has a hot desert climate (Köppen BWh). Summers are hot and dry, winters are short and mild, and annual precipitation is very low across most of the state.

Rainfall is minimal, often well below 50 mm per year, with a clear north–south gradient in precipitation across Sudan, rains in the north are sporadic and highly variable.

The region records some of Sudan's highest temperatures. Observations from northern stations show summer daytime maxima frequently above 40–45 °C (104–113 °F), with extreme highs near 49–50 °C (120–122 °F) recorded at Dongola.

Riverine settlements and the Nile corridor contrast with the surrounding desert. Dongola experiences very hot, arid summers with only trace annual precipitation, while Wadi Halfa is among the sunniest and driest locations in the region, receiving effectively zero to a few millimetres of rain annually.

High potential evaporation rates, strong solar radiation, low humidity, and large diurnal temperature ranges outside riverine areas combine to limit rain-fed agriculture, as a result, agricultural activity in Northern State is concentrated along the Nile where irrigation water is available.

Warming trends and increasing drought risk have been documented across northern Sudan, with declining rainfall and more frequent extreme heat events threatening water availability and livelihoods dependent on irrigation and Nile flows.

Climate data for Dongola
Month	Jan	Feb	Mar	Apr	May	Jun	Jul	Aug	Sep	Oct	Nov	Dec	Year
Mean daily maximum °C (°F)	26 (79)	29 (84)	34 (93)	39 (102)	42 (108)	43 (109)	42 (108)	41 (106)	40 (104)	36 (97)	31 (88)	27 (81)	36 (97)
Mean daily minimum °C (°F)	13 (55)	15 (59)	18 (64)	23 (73)	26 (79)	28 (82)	28 (82)	27 (81)	25 (77)	22 (72)	17 (63)	14 (57)	21 (70)
Average precipitation mm (inches)	0 (0)	0 (0)	0 (0)	0 (0)	0 (0)	0 (0)	0 (0)	0 (0)	0 (0)	0 (0)	0 (0)	0 (0)	0 (0)
Source: Weather Atlas

Climate data for Wadi Halfa
Month	Jan	Feb	Mar	Apr	May	Jun	Jul	Aug	Sep	Oct	Nov	Dec	Year
Mean daily maximum °C (°F)	23 (73)	26 (79)	31 (88)	37 (99)	41 (106)	43 (109)	43 (109)	42 (108)	41 (106)	36 (97)	29 (84)	24 (75)	35 (95)
Mean daily minimum °C (°F)	12 (54)	14 (57)	17 (63)	21 (70)	25 (77)	27 (81)	28 (82)	27 (81)	26 (79)	22 (72)	16 (61)	13 (55)	21 (70)
Average precipitation mm (inches)	0 (0)	0 (0)	0 (0)	0 (0)	0 (0)	0 (0)	0 (0)	0 (0)	0 (0)	0 (0)	0 (0)	0 (0)	0 (0)
Source: Weather Atlas

==== Environmental issues ====
Desertification and desert erosion threaten cultivable land along the Nile margins, as encroaching sand reduces the narrow floodplain strip on which most agriculture depends.

Date palm fires are a recurring hazard in the state. Fires were documented from the mid-2000s onward, with outbreaks in Merowe, Al Dabbah, and the area between Abri and Tebej. Fires are a threat to the state's primary crop, abandoned palm groves with accumulated dry fronds accelerate the spread of outbreaks. Approximately 250,000 palms were destroyed by fire between 2005 and 2016.

In November 2015, the former director of the Sudan Atomic Energy Commission, Mohamed Siddig, disclosed at a conference in Khartoum that 60 containers of nuclear waste from China were brought to Sudan during the construction of the Merowe Dam between 2004 and 2009 with 40 buried near the construction site and 20 disposed of in the desert. The Minister of Electricity and Dams, Moataz Mousa, subsequently acknowledged that 40 containers had been buried in a sealed cement hole near the dam, but stated they contained remnants of building materials rather than toxic waste. Sudan's Justice Ministry formed a committee of inquiry under the 1954 Commissions of Inquiry Act to investigate the allegations. During the early 2000's, Northern State had the highest percentage of cancer cases among all Sudanese states.

Localities of Northern State

=== Localities ===
1. Halfa
2. Delgo
3. Al Burgaig
4. Dongola
5. Al Golid
6. Ad Dabbah
7. Merwoe

=== Cities and towns ===
Settlement	Locality
Dongola (capital)	Dongola
Abri	Halfa
Al Dabbah	Ad Dabbah
Delgo	Delgo
El Khandaq	Al Golid
Old Dongola	Dongola
Karima	Merwoe
Korti	Merwoe
Merowe	Merwoe
Wadi Halfa	Halfa

== Demographics ==
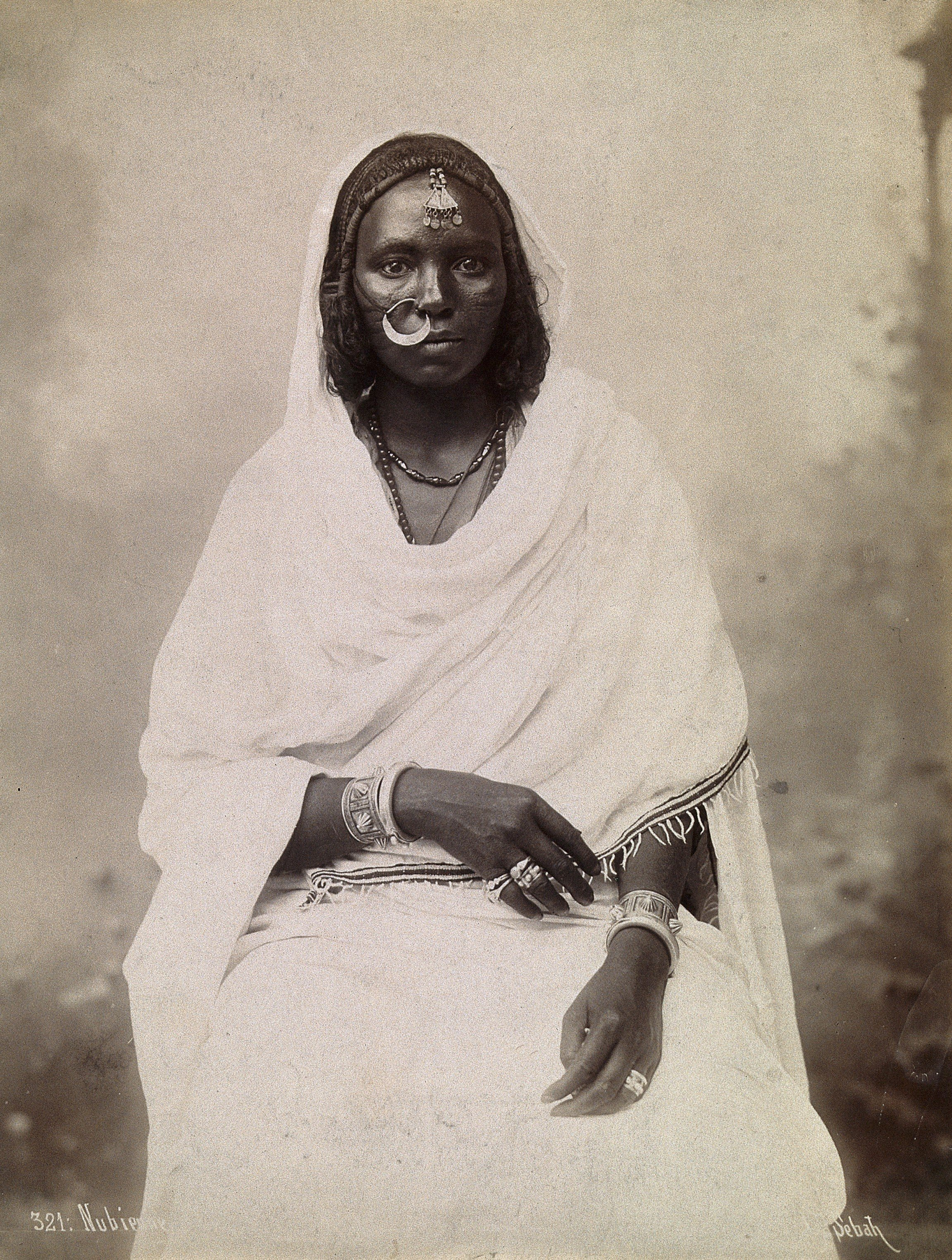
Portrait of a Nubian woman, c. 1890 CE.

=== Population ===
Northern State has a population of 936,255, with 473,690 of them being male, and 462,565 being female. Most residents live in settlements along the Nile, where agriculture is concentrated, while the surrounding desert regions remain sparsely populated.

=== Languages ===
Arabic is the primary language used in administration, education, and daily life across Northern State. Nobiin is spoken by the Halfawi, Mahas, and Sukkot Nubians from the Egyptian border to the Third Cataract of the Nile. Aandandi is spoken by the Danagla from Dongola to Al Dabbah.

=== Ethnic composition ===
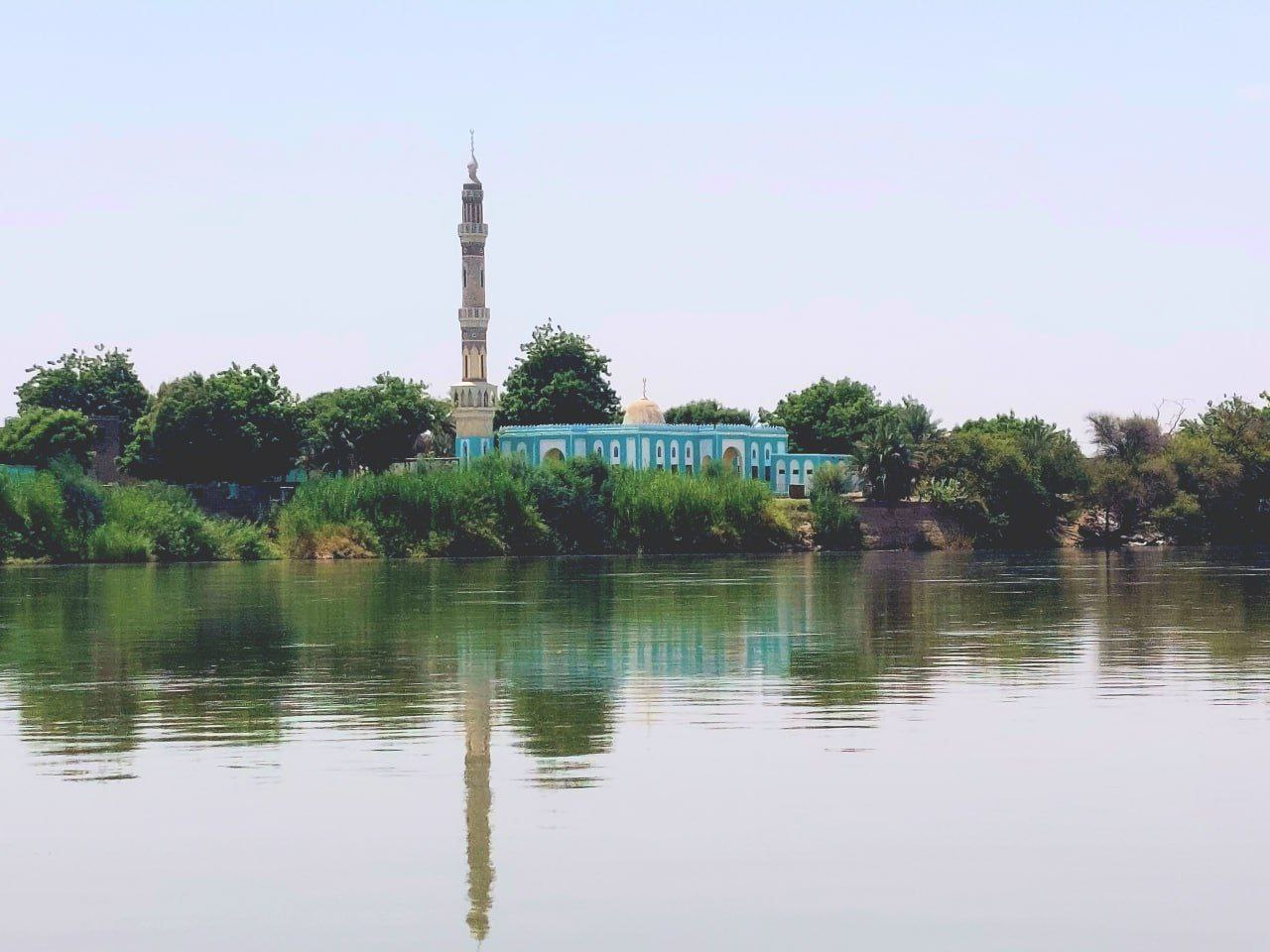
Mosque in Kerma, Northern State

Northern State is mainly inhabited by the Nubians, who are categorized into four subgroups in Sudan. The Halfawis near the border with Egypt, the Sukkot living a little north to the Third Cataract, the Mahas, in the Third Cataract region, and the Danagla in the Dongola reach. Northern is also home to Sudanese Arabs like the Shaigiya, the Manasir, and Hamadab. And Cushitic people like the Amri, and Beja in the east

=== Religion ===
Islam is the predominant religion in Northern State. Christianity and traditional religions are practiced by South Sudanese refugees.

== Economy ==
=== Date palm cultivation ===
Sudan has an estimated date palm population of approximately 8 million trees with annual production of about 330,000 tons, making it the eighth-largest date producing country in the world. Northern State is the primary center of date palm production within Sudan. Multiple date palm cultivars are grown in the area, including Barakawi, Gondaila, Jaw, Mishrig, Bittamoda, and Madini varieties. The Barakawi cultivar is the most widely cultivated variety. Date palms provide multiple products beyond fruit: the trunk serves as building material and furniture, fibers are used for rope-making and in the construction of Angareeb, a traditional bed strung with date palm fiber, flower stalks are woven into baskets, and pollen grains are consumed mixed with honey. Seeds are used as animal feed or mixed with milk for medicinal purposes. Date palms also provide shade and ornamental value to settlements.

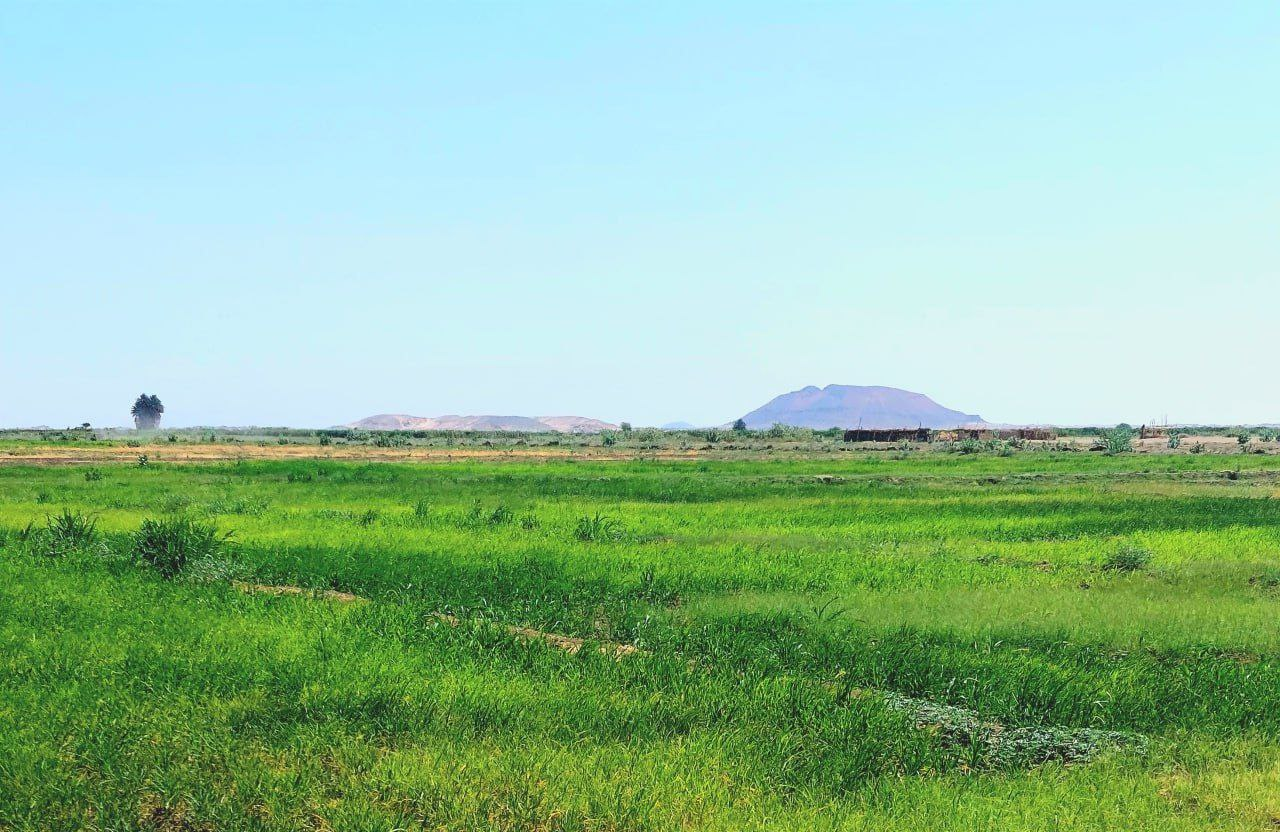
Farm at the edge of Kabrinarti village

=== Other agricultural production ===
Cotton, sesame, and other crops are cultivated alongside date palms. Private companies and large landholders have invested in capital-intensive agricultural projects on marginal soils, utilizing improved farming infrastructure and reliable groundwater resources. This shift toward irrigation dependent on groundwater has become necessary due to poor performance of traditional irrigation systems drawing from the Nile and anticipated changes in Nile water availability.

=== Mining ===
Gold mining is concentrated in the Nubian Desert away from most major settelements. Artisanal mining is practiced across parts of the state. Larger industrial exploration has attracted foreign investment. The Meyas Sand Gold Project is under exploration by Perseus Mining, headquartered in Australia, which acquired the project in 2022. The Sudanese civil war beginning in 2023 forced the suspension of operations at the site, with contractors and employees withdrawing. As of 2025, a final investment decision had been deferred.

== Transportation ==
=== River transportation ===
The Nile serves as the main transport corridor for the region, though its capacity for commercial navigation has limitations due to the cataracts of the Nile. River navigation between Egypt and Sudan was suspended for six years due to the instability caused by the Sudanese civil war. They resumed operations in January 2026. The resumed river navigation facilitates regional trade and movement of goods between the two countries.

=== Road and rail infrastructure ===
The A1 Highway runs along the east bank of the Nile from Dongola northward to Wadi Halfa. The Northern Lifeline road which connects Khartoum, Atbara, Abu Hamad, and Merowe was completed and fully paved by 2011.

Sudan Railways, operated by the state-run Sudan Railways Corporation, maintains the primary rail network serving Northern State. The main railway line extends from Wadi Halfa on the Egyptian border south to Khartoum via Abu Hamad and Atbara, with a branch line connecting to Karima. This rail infrastructure was originally constructed beginning in 1897 for British military use. The line serves both passenger and freight transport.

== Culture ==
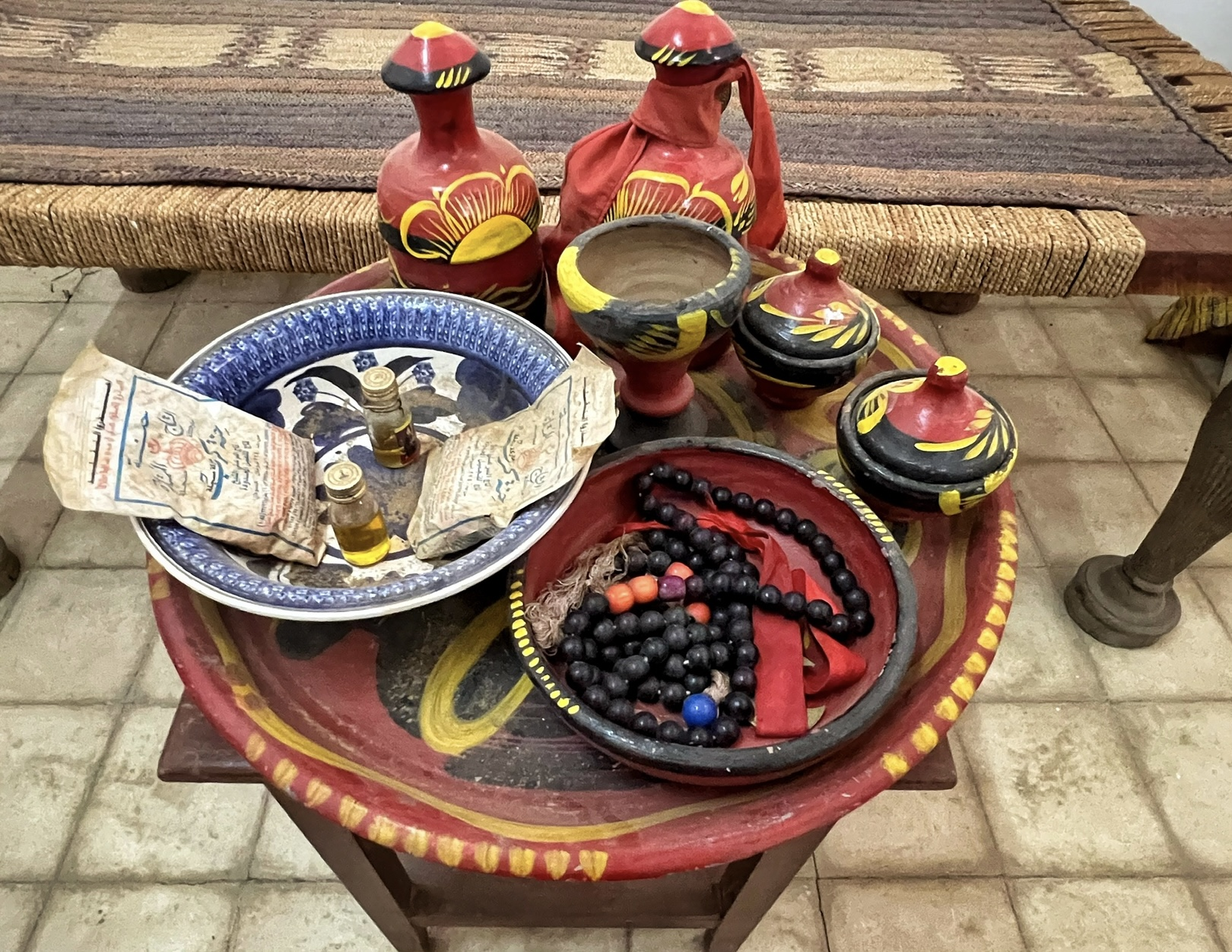
Sudanese wedding Jirtig paraphernalia

The Sebu is a birth ceremony practiced by Nubians, it's observed on the seventh day after a child is born, during which relatives and neighbors gather to sing and welcome the newborn. Jirtig is a Sudanese wedding ritual said to originate from Nubian coronation ceremonies. In December 2025, Jirtig was inscribed on UNESCO's Representative List of the Intangible Cultural Heritage of Humanity.

Scarification was practiced by Nubians. Mahas men and women would have three scars on each cheek, and the Danagla would have similar marks on the temples. The practice has become rare among younger generations.

The Shaigiya are known for their usage of the tanbura, a type of lyre played at celebrations and communal gatherings. A traditional game, Seega, is also played in Shaigiya communities, in which two players attempt to align five stones in a row on a grid drawn in the sand. Shaigiya men and women bore tribal facial marks cut into their cheeks, a custom that has similarly declined among younger generations.

The Manasir, who inhabit the area around the Fourth Cataract and the Bayuda Desert, combine riverine agriculture with seasonal pastoralism. A portion of the Manasir spend part of the year herding goats, sheep, and camels in the valleys of the Bayuda Desert during the rainy season, before returning to their riverbank lands for the agricultural season.

== Education ==
Education in Northern State follows Sudan's national system, under which primary education is free and compulsory for children between the ages of 6 and 13, followed by three years of secondary schooling. Instruction at all levels is conducted primarily in Arabic. Khalawi, have been the source of basic literacy and religious education in the region since the 16th century.

The principal institution of higher education in the state is the University of Dongola, a public university established in 1991 and located in the state capital. The university offers programs across multiple colleges including arts and humanities, science, agriculture, economics, law, medicine, education, and community development. Affiliated colleges are located elsewhere in the state, including a college of archaeology and heritage in Karima and a college of mining and geology in Wadi Halfa.

The Merowe University of Technology, established in 2009 and located in Merowe, is a public technical university offering programs in engineering and applied sciences, with a faculty of medicine added in 2015.

== Sports ==
Football is the most followed sport in Northern State, as it is across Sudan. Local clubs participate in the regional divisions of the Sudanese football pyramid, with matches in the state hosted in the towns of Dongola and Merowe. Al Ahli SC Merowe, based in Merowe, and Al Barkal, based in Karima, have both competed at the national level in the Sudan Premier League. At the national level, Al Hilal SC and Al Merrikh are Sudan's two most followed clubs and attract supporters throughout the country, including in Northern State.

== Judiciary ==
The judicial system of Northern State was established in September 1994, when the state received its current designation by presidential decree. Its geographic jurisdiction covers the full extent of the state, from Wadi Halfa in the north to Merowe in the south, and is administered from Dongola.

At the apex sits a single Court of Appeal, based in Dongola. Below it are four General Courts, located in Dongola, Merowe, Al Qawlad, and Arqu. Sixteen Magistrate Courts operate across the state in Dongola, Al Qawlad, Al Dabbah, Al Ghaba, Old Dongola, Al Tadamon, Merowe, Korti, Karima, Al Sabr, Arqu, Al Hafir, Kerma, Delgo, Abri, and Wadi Halfa. The administrative structure of the judiciary includes departments for administrative affairs, personnel management, judicial statistics, transport and logistics, and a general land council office overseeing civil cases relating to land in both urban and rural settings.

== See also ==
- Nubians
- Shaigiya tribe
- States of Sudan
