= Abri, Sudan =

Abri عبري
- Town
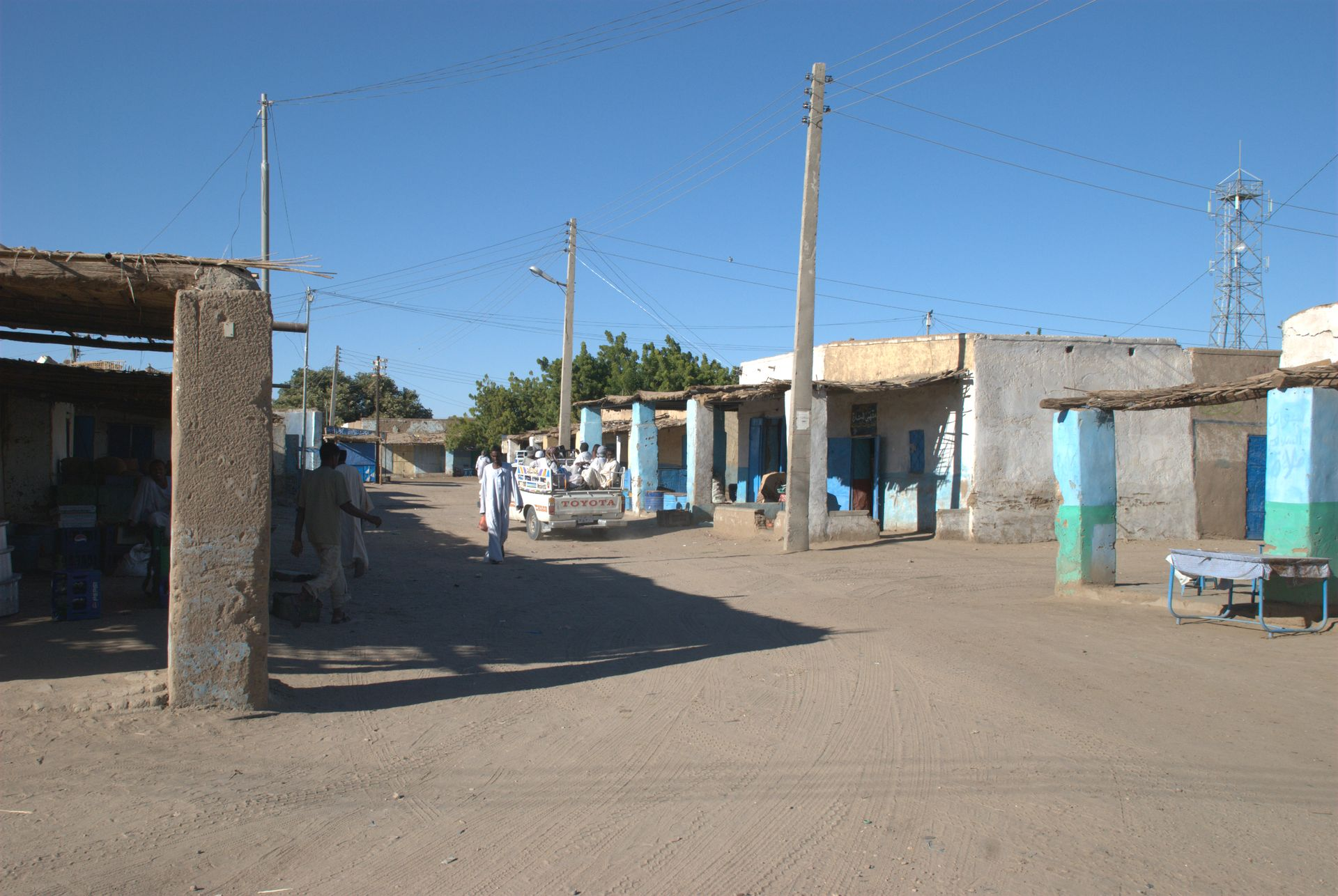

- Location in Sudan
- Coordinates: 20°47′8.91″N 30°20′12.07″E
- Country: Sudan
- Admin. division: Northern

Population
  - Total: 40,000

Abri (Arabic: عبري) is a small town, in the Sudanese wilayat of the Northern state. It is on the river bank of the Nile, and it lies near the second cataract that is now submerged by Lake Nasser. Its population is estimated to be about 40,000.

The next major settlement upriver is the town of Delgo, 105 km (65 mi) to the south.

== History ==
On 21 May 2026, police used tear gas at an electricity protest.
