= Manufacturing in Sudan =

Manufacturing in Sudan remains a relatively small sector of the economy, accounting for 11.75% of GDP as of 2019 according to the World Bank. Manufacturing in Sudan has a long history, with many forms of industry being attempted since World War II. Growth has been more consistent in the 21st century than previously.

== History ==
=== Colonial era ===
The development of modern manufacturing in Sudan received little direct encouragement during the Condominium Period. British economic policies aimed at expanding the production of primary products, mainly cotton, for export. Imports and traditional handicraft industries met the basic needs for manufactured goods. Indirectly, however, the vast Gezira Scheme led to the construction of cotton gins, of which more than 20 were in operation by the early 1930s. A secondary development was the establishment of several cottonseed oil-pressing mills. During World War II, small import-substitution industries arose, including those manufacturing soap, carbonated drinks, and other consumer items. These operations did not survive the competition from imports after the war's end. Foreign private interests invested in a few larger enterprises that included a meat-processing factory, a cement plant, and a brewery, all opened between 1949 and 1952.

=== Aftermath of independence ===
At independence the Sudanese government supported a private-sector industrial development policy. It adopted the Approved Enterprises (Concessions) Act of 1956, to encourage private Sudanese and foreign investment. The act placed few restrictions on foreign equity holdings. By 1961, however, the government had concluded that the private sector lacked either interest or funds to establish certain enterprises important to the national economy, so it entered the manufacturing field itself. The first government project was a tannery, which was followed by a sugar factory. In 1962 Khartoum formed the Industrial Development Corporation to manage government plants. Several additional government enterprises were built in the 1960s, including a second sugar factory, two fruit and vegetable canneries, a date-processing plant, an onion-dehydrating plant, a milk-processing plant, and a cardboard factory. The private sector also made substantial investments then, which resulted in factories making textiles and knitwear, shoes, soap, soft drinks, and flour. Other private enterprises included printing facilities and additional oil-pressing mills. Among the largest private undertakings was the foreign-financed and foreign-built oil refinery at Port Sudan, which opened in 1964. Well over half the investment in the private sector during the decade came from foreign sources.

=== 1970s ===
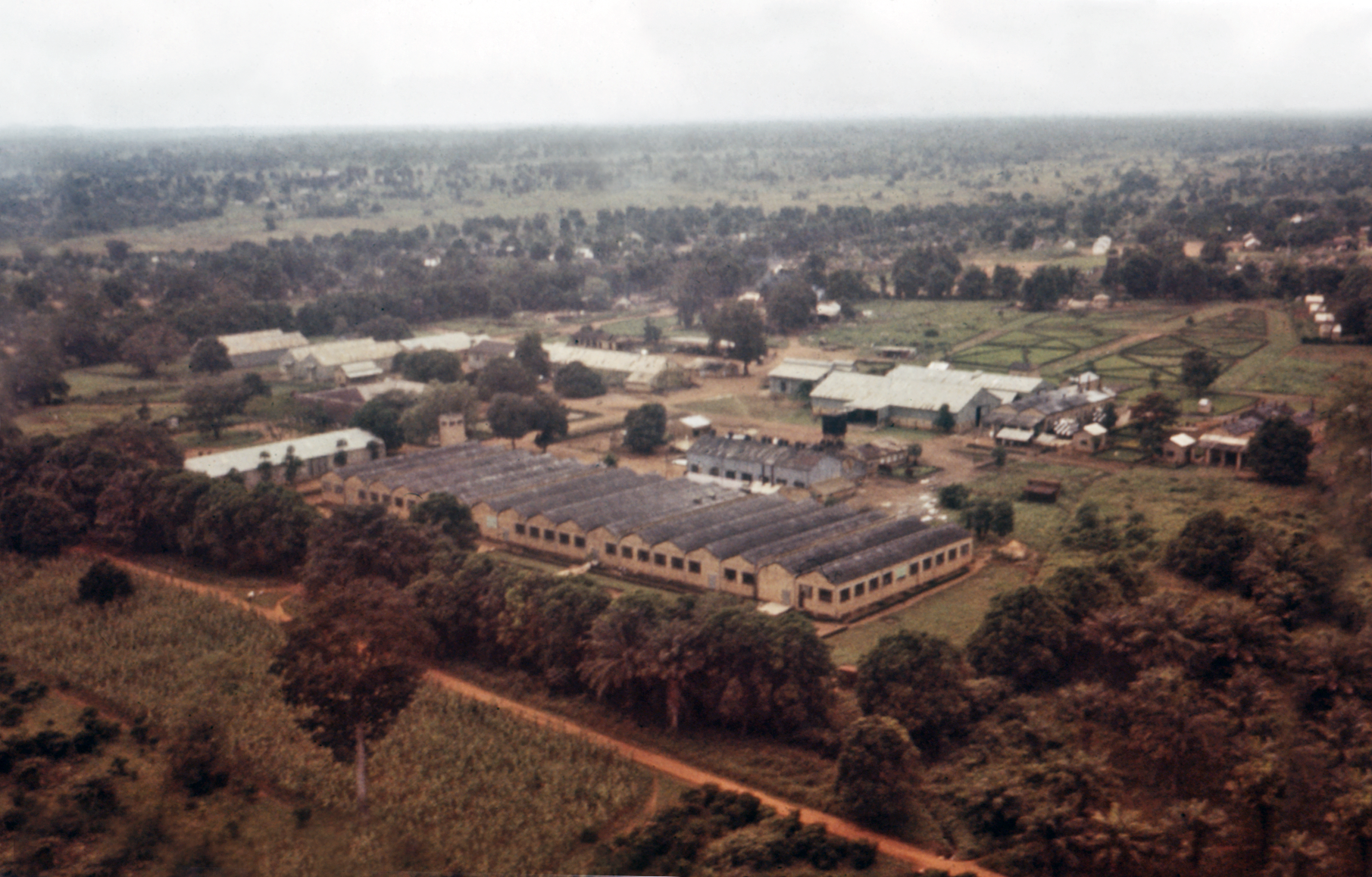
A cotton factory in Nzara, Sudan

Direct government participation in the manufacturing sector increased dramatically after the 1969 military coup and policies aimed at placing the country's economic development in government hands, although private ownership continued. During 1970 and 1971, Khartoum nationalized more than 30 private enterprises. In 1972, however, to counter the drop in foreign private investment that followed, Colonel Ja’far al-Numayri announced that private capital would again be accorded favorable treatment, and the government passed the Development and Promotion of Industrial Investment Act of 1972, containing provisions that were more liberal than earlier legislation.

The economy remained dependent on private capital from developed nations, so the government incorporated further incentives in a 1974 revision of the industrial investment act and added provisions against arbitrary nationalization. Moreover, in 1972 Khartoum denationalized some enterprises and returned them to their former owners under a joint public–private ownership arrangement.

Throughout the 1970s, the government continued to establish new public enterprises, some state-owned, others in conjunction with private interests, and some having foreign government participation, especially by the Arab oil-producing states. The new plants included three sugar factories, two tanneries, a flour mill, and more than 20 textile plants. A joint venture with U.S. interests built Sudan's first fertilizer plant south of Khartoum, which was in operation by 1986. Private investment continued, particularly in textiles.

=== 1980s ===
Total manufacturing output declined in the 1980s. Capacity utilization was as low as 30 percent in many plants, and down to 10 percent at some textile factories in 1997, despite a ready local supply of high-quality cotton. About 85 percent of all factories in Khartoum's main industrial area were operating below full capacity in 1998. A shortage of fuel in oil-fired power stations in Khartoum caused frequent power outages (see Energy in Sudan), which forced plant owners to install generators, but a shortage of foreign exchange for diesel fuel for the generators kept capacity utilization low. Obsolete equipment, lack of trained personnel, and uncompetitive costs also contributed to the slow growth of the sector.

=== Growth: 1998–present ===
Growth of the manufacturing sector increased in 1998 with the construction of an oil pipeline, a new refinery, and work on the terminal at Port Sudan. The development of the export oil industry provided foreign exchange for imported machinery. Reforms in the financial sector and privatization also contributed to growth. Telecommunications and food processing, especially sugar refining, gained from these changes, as well as from increased foreign investment. The manufacturing sector grew by 6 percent in real terms in 1999, by 11.5 percent in 2000, and by 5.7 percent in 2008, although it began from a low base. The government's 1997 economic reform program facilitated this growth.

Food processing was the most successful category of investment, especially sugar refining. Production of refined sugar exceeded domestic demand, allowing Sudan to become the Arab world's only net sugar exporter. There are five government-owned sugar producers, but the leading producer is the Kananah Sugar Company, the major part of which is privately owned. Its success attracted investment in the White Nile Sugar Company, which began production in 2011 and was expected to reach full capacity of 450,000 tonnes per year by 2012. A new refinery designed to produce 100,000 tonnes per year was also being planned in Sinnar State. The production of sugar reached 738,500 tonnes per year in 2009 but fell to 642,000 tonnes in 2010.

Government estimates suggest that the textile industry, which uses domestic cotton, could produce 110 percent of Sudanese requirements if it operated at full capacity. There are 75 small, privately owned companies and nine large state-owned factories producing spun yarn and fabric. The largest factory is the government-owned Friendship Textile Mill built by the Chinese in the 1960s, with a capacity of 2,100 tonnes of yarn per day and 16 million meters of fabric per year. The most important private-sector factory is the Sudan Textile Industries, with a capacity of 64 million meters per year. Although Sudan is an important producer of high-quality cotton, textile production declined continuously from 274 million meters in the 1970s to just 13.72 million meters in 2003, a capacity-utilization rate of just 5 percent.

Work began on the Red Sea Free-Trade Zone between Port Sudan and the port of Sawakin in July 1999. The project was designed to cover 600 square kilometers. The initial zone of 26 square kilometers included a warehouse and industrial and commercial areas. The original investors were from Qatar, Saudi Arabia, and the UAE. In January 2000, a cooperation agreement was signed between the Red Sea Free Trade Zone and the Free-Trade Zone of Jebel Ali, UAE, in which the UAE pledged to help Sudan establish free-trade zones in all of its border areas, thus linking trade between East Asia and Africa via Sudan. The UAE also promised to increase marketing and shipping activities and to exchange personnel and technical information. Saudi Arabia's Jiddah Free-Trade Zone signed a similar agreement. The Red Sea Free Trade Zone was opened in February 2000. Two years later, however, there were reports that only seven of the factories in the zone were still functioning; since then, the zone apparently has collapsed.

In October 2000, the US$450 million Giad industrial city opened 40 kilometers south of Khartoum. As of 2010, it had 13 separate companies, including factories for manufacturing cables, electrical wires, steel, and pipeline products. It also had large arms-manufacturing and automotive-manufacturing industries. Other factories assembled small autos and trucks, and some heavy military equipment such as armored personnel carriers and the proposed “Bashir” battle tank. The town also had housing, health, and education facilities.

There are other small-scale manufacturing sectors in Sudan. They include pharmaceuticals, electrical goods, cement, textiles, and paints.

In 2019, World Bank data recorded that manufacturing was responsible for 11.75% of Sudan's GDP.
