= Energy in Sudan =

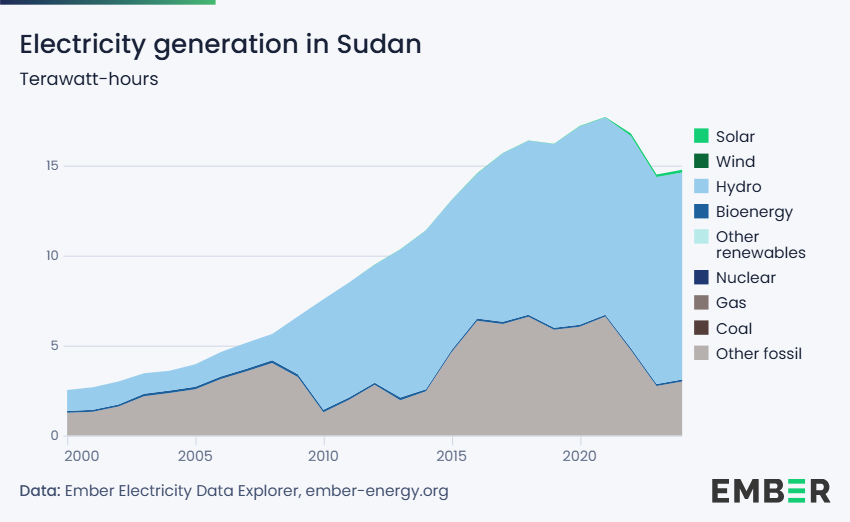
Electricity generation in Sudan in terawatt-hours

Energy in Sudan describes energy and electricity production, consumption and imports in Sudan. The chief sources of energy in 2010 were wood and charcoal, hydroelectric power, and oil. Sudan is a net energy exporter. Primary energy use in Sudan was 179 TWh and 4 TWh per million persons in 2008.

== Primary sources ==
=== Wood and charcoal ===
Wood and charcoal were principally used for household cooking and heating. Substantial quantities of wood fuels were also used by commercial operations—chiefly baking and brick making and, to a lesser extent, tobacco curing. Other vegetable matter including sugarcane bagasse also came into use, meeting a significant part of the energy needs of the sugar mills. Cotton stalks were also used for household fuel. Consumption of wood and charcoal continued to increase as the population grew, and there was concern over the gradual depletion of forest and woodland resources serving the large towns. Overuse of the sparser vegetation in the semi-desert grazing areas reportedly resulted in some fuel deficiencies in those regions, as well as in desertification.

=== Natural gas ===
A search for oil in the early 1960's along the Red Sea coast also discovered natural gas. In the mid-1970s, additional oil explorations revealed more gas finds, but development was not considered at the time to be commercially feasible. In October 1988, Sudan announced that natural gas production would start in one year. Although it was estimated in 2002 that there were 3 billion cubic feet of natural gas reserves, production had not yet begun by 2010.

=== Hydropower ===
see Electricity generation

=== Fuel oil ===
Light distillate oil, Diesel fuel oil

Heavy Fuel Oil, imported or as waste from refineries.

== Organisation ==
Sudan Light and Power Company

National Electricity Corporation (NEC)

The NEC was split into four separate entities in 2010:

Sudanese Electricity Transmission Company (SETCO)

Sudanese Electricity Distribution Company Ltd.

Sudanese Thermal Power Generation Company (STPGC)

Sudanese Hydro Generation Company Ltd (SHGC)

== Electricity generation ==
=== History ===
Electricity generation began in 1908 when a private company constructed the first power station at Burri al-Daralsa near Khartoum. The modern system dates from 1925 with the establishment of the Sudan Light and Power Company, an enterprise financed and managed by British entrepreneurs but owned by the Condominium government. This company, acquired in full by the colonial government in 1952, was the precursor—through several name changes and reorganizations—of the National Electricity Corporation (NEC).

The Sennar and Roseires dams were originally constructed to provide irrigation, Sennar in 1925 and Roseires in 1966. Electric-power generating facilities were added only when increasing consumer demands made them potentially viable. The first hydropower station began operating at the Sennar Dam in 1962, and a transmission line carried power to the Khartoum area. The main hydropower station began producing electricity in 1973 at the Roseires Dam on the Blue Nile, approximately 315 miles southeast of Khartoum. A plan for electricity production over the next 25 years evaluated the potential for hydro-generation on the Nile River and the locations for electricity generation.

The National Electricity Corporation and the Ministry of Energy and Dams are responsible for generation and supply of electricity in Sudan's two interconnected grids, the Blue Nile Grid and the small Western Grid, although they cover only a small portion of the country around Khartoum and south to Blue Nile State, areas that include only about 30 percent of the population. Even in those areas, the supply is inadequate, with output around 500 megawatts for much of the 2000– 2010 period, far below the demand for electric power, and unreliable; power outages were common, even in the capital. As a result, power production is dependent on small diesel-fired power stations and consumers' oil-driven generators.

Sudan relies heavily on hydroelectricity. In 2006, the country had total installed capacity of 4,520 gigawatt-hours (about 115 kilowatthours per head), 41 percent of which was provided by hydropower stations. As a result, power tended to fluctuate according to the flow of the Nile. Until recently, the Roseires Dam was the largest of the hydroelectric facilities, with smaller ones existing elsewhere on the Blue Nile and the Atbarah River.

The sector deteriorated in the 1990's because of a lack of funding. In 2000, however, the NEC launched the Rehabilitation and Performance Improvement Program supported by a US$10 million loan from the OPEC Fund for International Development to upgrade the existing infrastructure and improve the reliability of the electricity supply. In 2001 the NEC announced that Sudan and Ethiopia had agreed to link their power grids, and a related report announced that Ethiopia had also agreed to export power to Sudan.

In January 2010, a contract was awarded to Norplan, a Norwegian organization, to design three new power stations on tributaries of the Nile in Ethiopia. This project would come under the auspices of the Nile Basin Initiative, an organization promoting water cooperation among the Nile Basin countries. Ethiopia, Egypt, and Sudan would contribute to the cost of the power stations, and the electricity would be shared among the three countries. The stations were to be built at Kara Dubi (1,600 megawatts), Mendia (2,000 megawatts) and Bako Ambo (2,100 megawatts). The Ethiopian Electric Power Corporation was expected to be the main contractor, but Asian companies such as the Chinese firms that constructed the Merowe Dam were also likely to be involved. Construction work on a high-voltage electricity connection between Sudan and Ethiopia had already begun.

Several newly completed projects have increased installed capacity. The 257-megawatt diesel power station constructed by a Malaysian-led consortium outside Khartoum became operational in 2004. The Chinese firm Harbin Power Engineering Company built another power station near Al-Jayli (Garri) refinery north of Khartoum.

The largest projects are the Kajbar and Merowe hydroelectric facilities. The Kajbar Dam, on the second cataract of the Nile, has a planned capacity of 300 megawatts. Sudan and China signed an agreement to build the dam in 1997, with China financing 75 percent of the project (approximately US$200 million), but construction had not yet started by January 2011. Environmental groups have been concerned about potential damage to the Nile ecosystem and the culture of the displaced Nubian residents.

The 1,250-megawatt Merowe Dam, the most ambitious project, is located about 350 kilometers north of Khartoum on the fourth cataract of the Nile. The Dams Implementation Unit (DIU), a public body that reports to the presidency, was established in 2005, primarily to oversee construction of the dam. The China International Water and Electric Company was the main contractor for construction of the dam, and Harbin Power agreed to build seven substations and approximately 1,610 kilometers of transmission lines. Two consortia of Chinese, Greek, and Italian firms bid for the contract to build three packages of the civil works portion of the dam, which was estimated to cost US$1.9 billion. Several Arab funds (including the Arab Fund for Economic and Social Development, the Abu Dhabi Fund for Development, the Kuwait Fund for Arab Economic Development, and the Saudi Fund for Development) agreed to provide US$600 million in concessional funding. The dam should more than double previous production after extensive investment in the two interlocking national grids and transmission systems. The project is also expected to create a large, new area of cultivable land, although it has already required evacuation of tens of thousands of residents from the reservoir area. The project also included other major construction work, including an international airport at Merowe, a bridge over the Nile at Kuraymah, and upgrading the local railroad line. In March 2009, President al-Bashir attended a ceremony to inaugurate the tenth and final electricity unit at the power station, which brought the Merowe Dam up to its full generation capacity. Its completion helped account for Sudan's total power generation of 7,653.3 gigawatts per hour in 2010, of which 81.0 percent (6,199.3 gigawatts) came from hydropower.

Other projects in the program to increase output included a planned doubling of capacity at the oil-fired Khartoum North power plant, the construction of a 500-megawatt oil-fired power station in Kosti in White Nile state, construction of a dam on the Setit tributary of the Atbarah River in eastern Sudan, and further construction to heighten the Roseires Dam on the Blue Nile in order to double its electricity-generating capacity to 560 megawatts. The DIU also had plans for water-harvesting projects in North Kordofan (a state that has no year-round flowing rivers), and proposals to build dams and water reservoirs in Sodiri, Al-Nuhud, and Hamrat al-Sheikh. There was no significant power-generating capacity in the South or West in 2010, although there were plans for hydroelectric projects and the electrification of 20 Southern towns with local diesel-powered grids, as well as for the extension of the national grid in the North to Darfur and Kordofan.

In January 2010, Taqa Arabia of Egypt entered a joint venture with ASEC Cement of Egypt and the Sudanese Pension Fund to build a 42 megawatt power station to provide electricity for the Takamol cement plant being built by ASEC at Atbarah, 200 kilometers north of Khartoum. The cement plant had a capacity of 1.6 million tonnes a year to help meet demand from the construction-related boom in and around Khartoum.

Currently (2019) the power station at Garri is being extended by the Sudanese Thermal Power Generation Company. It will be fired by light distillate oil and later by heavy fuel oil.

A new power station is currently (2019) being constructed near Port Sudan by the Sudanese Thermal Power Generation Company.

=== See also ===
List of power stations in Sudan

=== Grand Ethiopian Renaissance Dam (in Ethiopia) ===
Apart from various controversies around the construction of the Grand Ethiopian Renaissance Dam in Ethiopia, its associated hydro power station is planned to supply additional electrical power to neighboring countries, including Sudan.

== Issues between Sudan and South Sudan following its independence ==
South Sudan became independent from the Sudan in 2011.

=== Use of existing oil pipeline to Port Sudan ===
Oil from the South of Sudan was exported via the facilities at Port Sudan until 2012 when joint activities were disrupted due to disagreements regarding transfer tariffs. A commercial agreement was reached in 2014 allowing South Sudan to again transfer its oil to Port Sudan via the existing pipeline on Sudanese territory.

== Statistics ==
Energy in Sudan
	Capita	Prim. energy	Production	Export	Electricity	CO_{2}-emission
	Million	TWh	TWh	TWh	TWh	Mt
2004	35.5	205	341	-134	3.28	9.71
2007	38.6	171	403	-219	3.64	10.87
2008	41.4	179	406	-222	3.99	12.06
2009	42.27	184	409	213	4.85	13.26
2012	44.63				6.72	14.51
Change 2004-09	19.0%	10.3%	20.0%	58.7%	47.9%	36.6%
Mtoe = 11.63 TWh, Prim. energy includes energy losses
