= Gararish =

Gararish is a designated tribal area within the Northern State of Sudan, to the south of the state's capital, Dongola and on the right bank of the River Nile. The 1911 Encyclopædia Britannica describes the Gararish as a semi-nomadic, semi-agricultural tribe "of Semitic origin" and gives their location as further north, between Wadi Halfa and Merawi.
