= Wawa, Sudan =

Wawa واوا
- Location in Sudan
- Coordinates: 20°26′N 30°21′E
- Country: Sudan
- State: Northern

Wawa (Arabic: واوا) is a town in northern Sudan near the Nile River, located at 20°26′N 30°21′E.

The town sits directly across the Nile River from the ancient city of Soleb

Pebble tools from the early Stone Age have been found in this area including an early hand axe dating roughly 1.5 million to 200,000 years ago
