= Sesebi =

New Kingdom Egyptian town on the west bank of the Nile

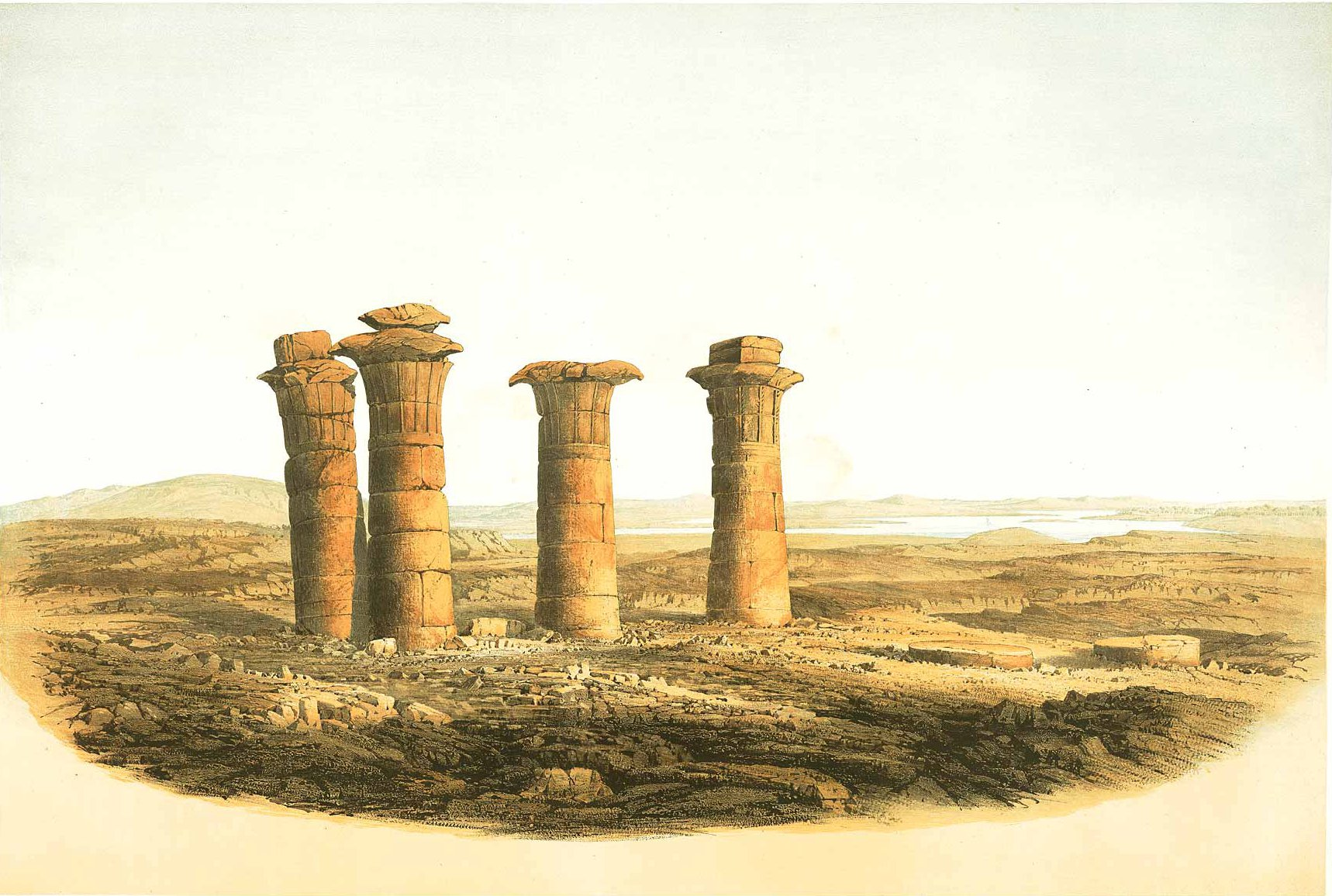

- Location within Sudan
- 20°06′35″N 30°32′35″E
- Type: settlement

History
- Built by: Amenhotep IV

Site notes
- Length: 270 m (890 ft)
- Width: 200 m (660 ft)

Sesebi or Sesibi was a New Kingdom Egyptian town on the west bank of the Nile, across from Delgo, Sudan. A temple was built there by Akhenaten, who appointed a viceroy to maintain the structure, govern the local settlement, and secure traffic on the Nile.
