= Amri people =

Ethnic group of Sudan

Amri (Arabic: العمري) is an Arabic ethnic group of Sudan. The members of this group speak Sudanese Arabic.

Amri live in Nubia, in Northern Sudan and were heavily affected by the building of Merowe dam. They refused to be settled in Wadi Al Mugadam instead of choosing to live around the reservoir shores. The resistance of the Amri people lead to Merowe Dam authorities to attack their villages with machine guns and heavy artillery killing three and injuring over 50 people in 2006.
