= Merowe, Sudan =

Town in Northern State, Sudan

Merowe مروي
- Town
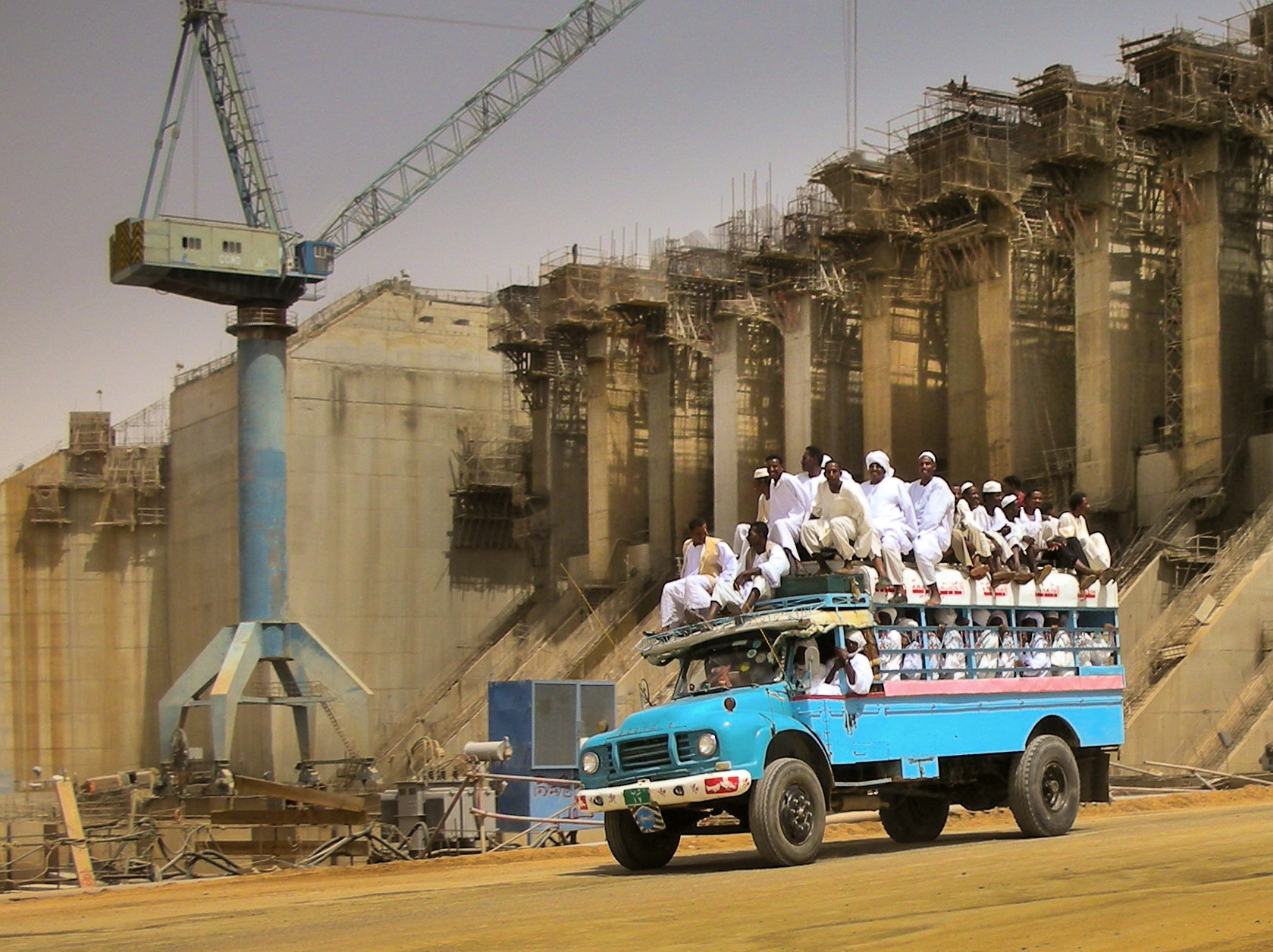
- Passengers on a Bedford truck in front of the Merowe Dam while it was under construction.

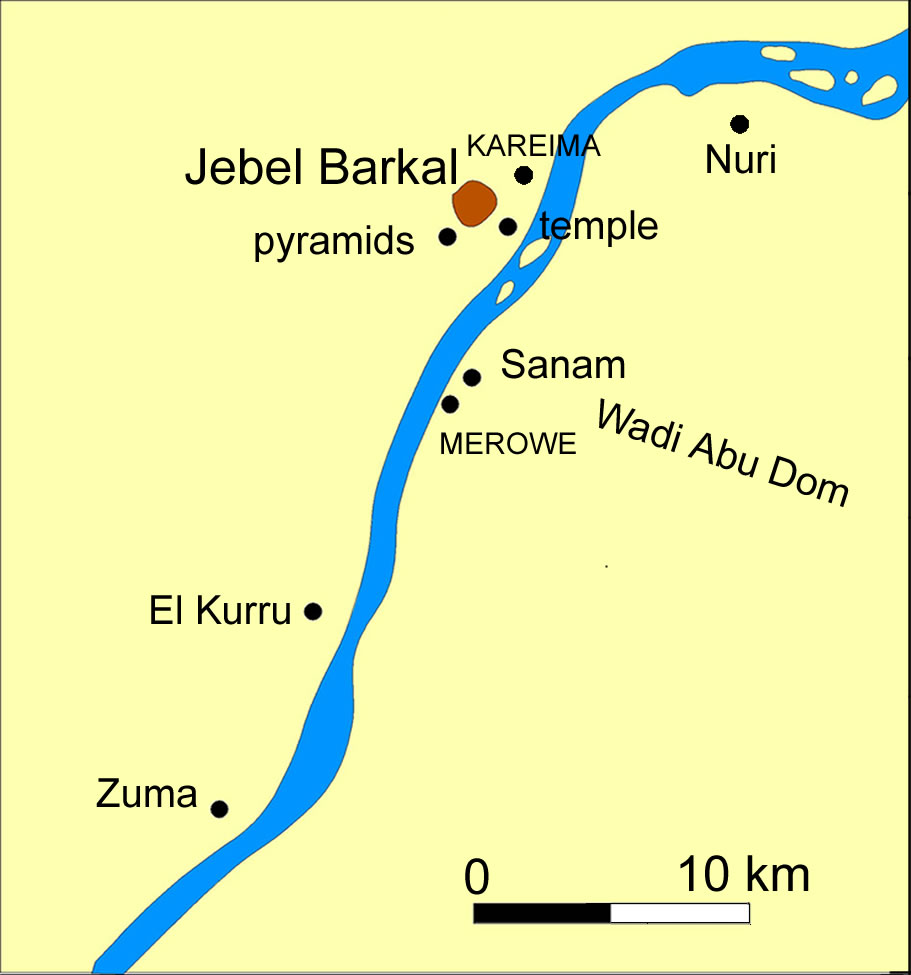
- Merowe's location in Sudan

- Location in Sudan and Africa Merowe (Africa)
- Coordinates: 18°29′00″N 31°49′00″E
- Country: Sudan
- State: Northern State

Merowe is a town in Northern State, Sudan, near Karima Town, about 330 kilometres (210 mi) north of Khartoum. It borders the Nile and is the site of the Merowe Dam project, the largest contemporary hydropower project in Africa.

== History ==
During the 2023 Sudan conflict, the Battle of Merowe was fought between the Sudanese Armed Forces and the Rapid Support Forces. By 21 April 2023, the Sudanese military and the Egyptian army pushed the RSF out the city.

== Transport ==
Merowe is 5.5 kilometres (3.4 mi) from Merowe Airport, and is served by a branch of the national railway network. The old Merowe Town Airport existed 3 km to the west next to a built up area to the west.

== Sports ==
- Al Ahli Club Merowe

== See also ==
- Railway stations in Sudan
