= Danagla =

Nubian tribe in northern Sudan

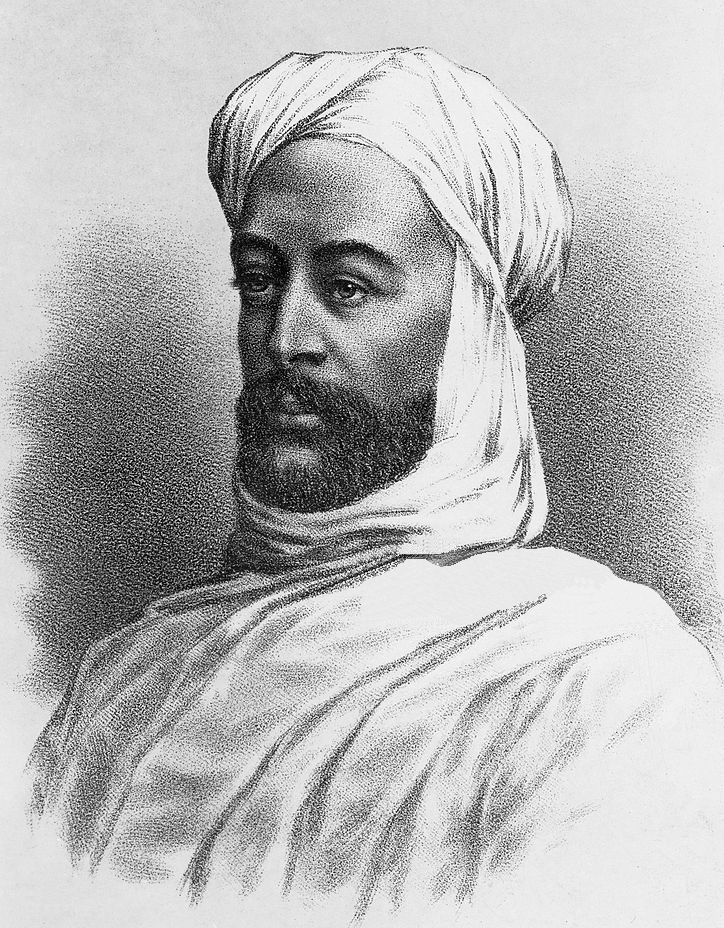
Mahdyyia leader Muhammad Ahmed (1843–1885), a Dongolawi born on Labab Island near New Dongola.

The Danagla (Arabic: الدناقلة, "People of Dongola") are a Nubian tribe in northern Sudan primarily settling between the third Nile cataract and al Dabbah. Along with Kenzi, Mahas, Fadicca, Halfawi and Sikot they form a significant part of the Nubians. They traditionally speak the Nubian Dongolawi or Andaandi language, which in the 19th century was still spoken as far south as Korti and probably even further upstream. Today it is threatened by complete replacement by Arabic as it is only spoken among parts of the population, especially the elders, although there are a lot of initiatives to revive it among the young generations. Due to this some modern scholars count the Danagla to the Nubians instead of the Sudanese Arabs, although many Danagla consider themselves to be a branch of the Arab Ja'alin tribe, who claim to descend from Abbas.

== Etymology ==
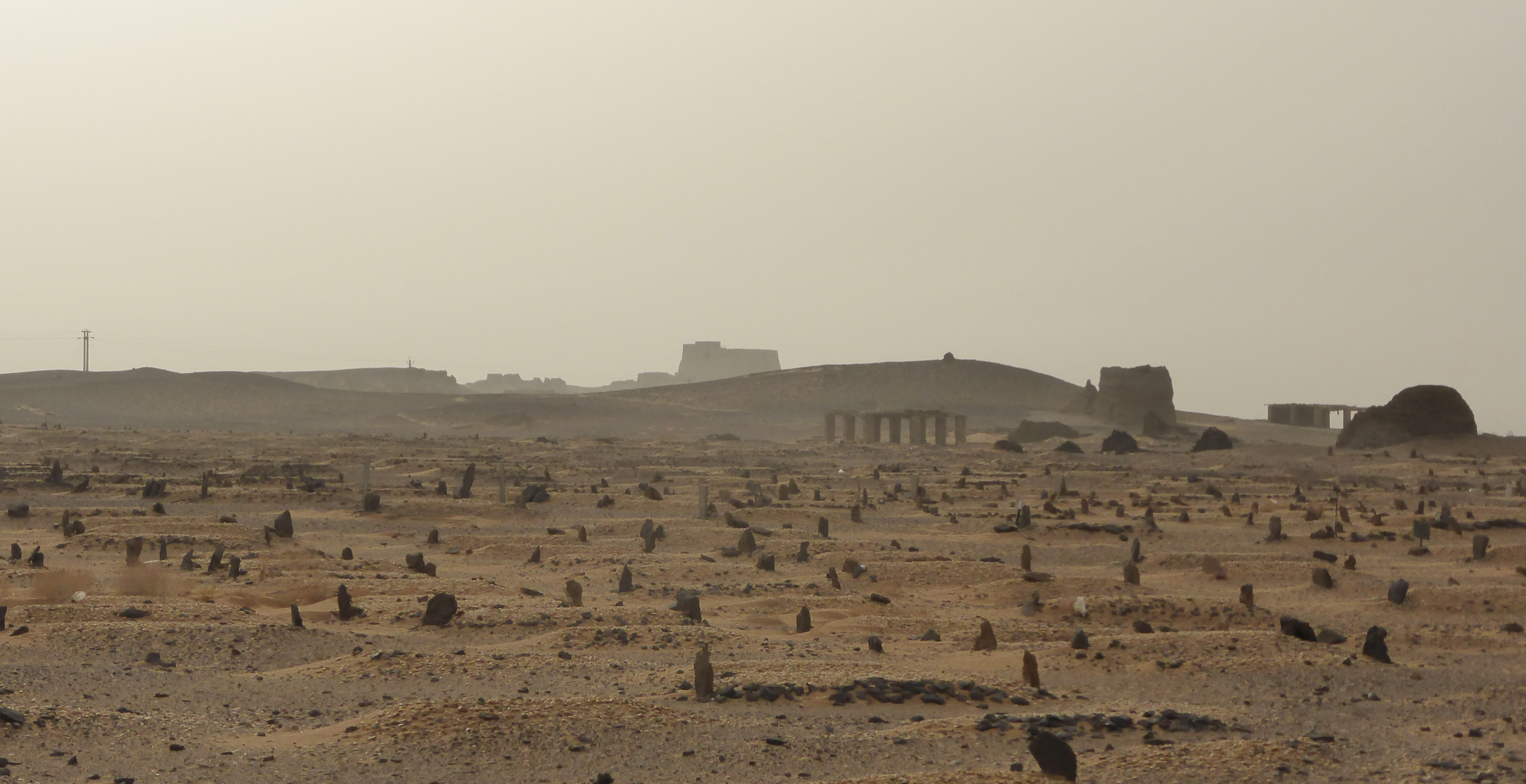
The ruins of Old Dongola, after which the Danagla are named.

The term Danagla comes from the city of Old Dongola, which was the capital of the Makurian Kingdom during Christianity in Nubia, as well as the Muslim Kingdom of Dongola that came after it, which was also in control of the traditional lands of the tribe. Although the term Danagla probably wasn't used among the locals until the spread of Islam, the natives prefer to designate themselves as "Andaandi", which is a word in Nubian that means ("That of our home"), or Dongolaandi ("That of Dongola").

== Genetics ==
According to Y-DNA analysis by Hassan et al (2008), around 44% of Nubians and Danaglas generally in Sudan carry the haplogroup J in individually varied but rather small percentages. The remainder mainly belong to the E1b1b clade (23%). Both paternal lineages are also common among local Afroasiatic-speaking populations.

Thus it's observed that approximately 83% of their Nubian samples carried various subclades of the Africa-centered macrohaplogroup L. Of these mtDNA lineages, the most frequently borne clade was L3 (30.8%), followed by the L0a (20.6%), L2 (10.3%), L1 (6.9%), L4 (6.9%) and L5 (6.9%) haplogroups. The remaining 17% of Nubians belonged to sublineages of the Eurasian macrohaplogroups M (3.4% M/D, 3.4% M1) and N (3.4% N1a, 3.4% preHV1, 3.4% R/U6a1). These results can be used as rough estimates of genetics most Nubians hold.

== Literature ==
- Abu Salim, Muhammad Ibrahim; O'Fahey, R.S. (1994). "The Writings of the Mahdiyya and Khalifa". The writings of Eastern Sudanic Africa to c.1900. Brill. pp. 304–341.
- Adams, William Y. (1977). Nubia. Corridor to Africa. Princeton University Press. ISBN 978-0-691-09370-3.
- Bjokelo, Anders (2003). Prelude to the Mahdiyya: Peasants and Traders in the Shendi Region, 1821-1851. Cambridge University Press. ISBN 0-521-53444-5.
- Gerhards, Gabriel (2023). "Präarabische Sprachen der Ja'aliyin und Ababde in der europäischen Literatur des 19. Jahrhunderts". Der Antike Sudan (in German). 34. Sudanarchäologische Gesellschaft zu Berlin e.V: 135–152.
