= Battle of Merowe Airport =

2023 battle in Sudan

- Part of the Sudanese civil war (2023–present)
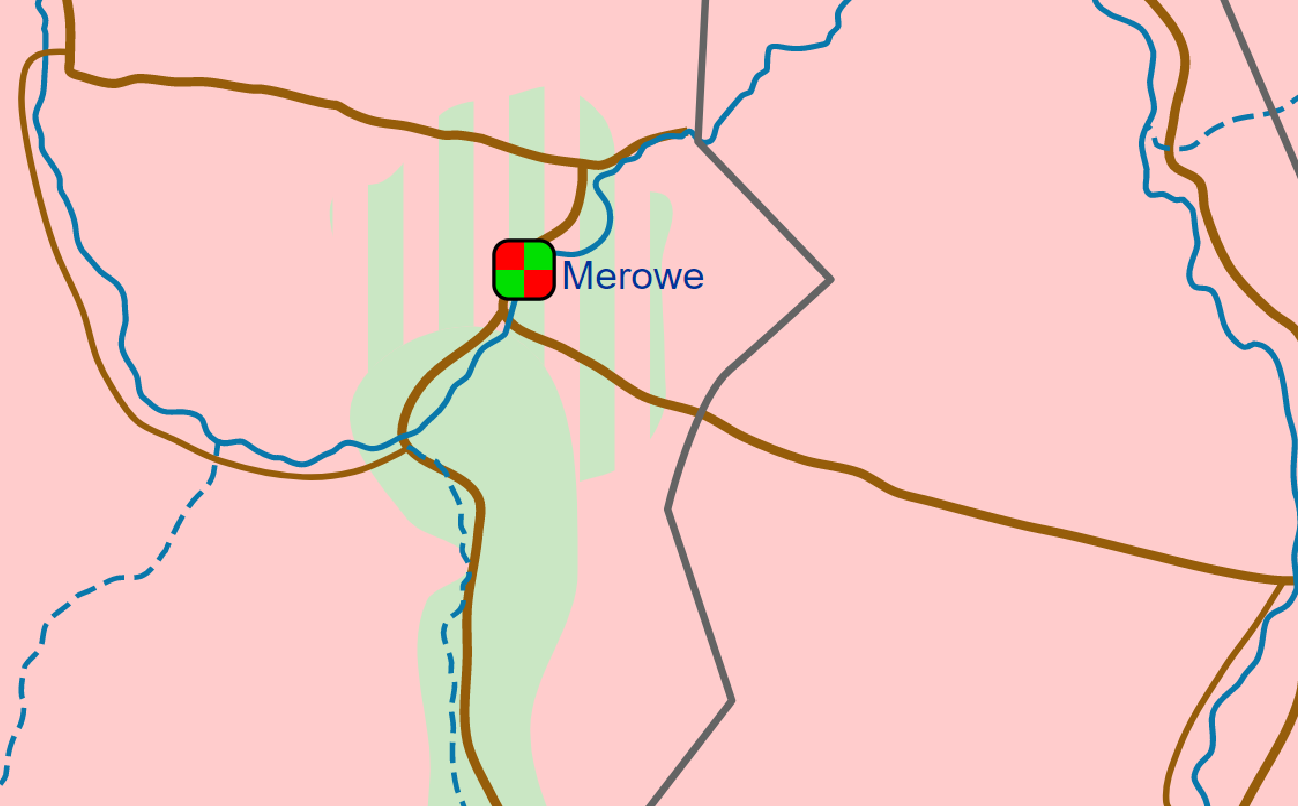
Date	15–21 April 2023 (6 days)
Location	Merowe Airport, Merowe, Sudan
Result	SAF victory: RSF captures Merowe airport on April 15; SAF captures the airport on April 19, and RSF retreats from Merowe on April 21

Belligerents
Sudanese government; Sudanese Armed Forces; Egypt	Rapid Support Forces

Units involved
Egyptian Air Force	Unknown

Casualties and losses
204 POWs	Unknown

The battle of Merowe Airport happened in April 2023 during the Sudanese civil war. It involved fighting between the Rapid Support Forces (RSF) and Sudanese Armed Forces (SAF) for control of the city of Merowe and its airport, and began with the RSF taking over 200 Egyptian soldiers as prisoners of war.

== Background ==
On 11 April 2023, RSF forces deployed near the city of Merowe and in Khartoum. Government forces ordered them to leave, but they refused. This led to clashes when RSF forces took control of the Soba military base south of Khartoum. On 13 April, RSF forces began their mobilization, raising fears of a potential rebellion against the junta. The SAF declared the mobilization illegal.

== Battle ==
At noon on April 15, RSF forces claimed to have captured Merowe Airport. In their statement, they claimed to have captured several Egyptian soldiers at the airport as well, along with a plane with markings of the Egyptian Air Force. While initially no official explanation was given for the Egyptian soldiers' presence, Egypt later stated around 200 of their soldiers were conducting exercises with the Sudanese military.

The next day, at around 13:30 local time, the SAF announced the rescue of a major general and a brigadier, along with the arrests of multiple officers at Merowe airport. The SAF also claimed the capture of the airport, with videos showing army vehicles storming the base. The army also claimed several RSF leaders had deserted or surrendered to the SAF. Some RSF members that deserted brought the Egyptian prisoners with them.

Fighting broke out the next day west of Merowe Airport, and by 10:00 AM local time, the RSF claimed to have full control over the airport. On April 18, eyewitnesses reported seeing an RSF column heading away from the perimeter of the airport towards al-Multaqa following SAF airstrikes on the airport. By April 19, the SAF had regained full control over the airport, although it had been destroyed. The RSF still claimed to have a presence in other parts of Merowe. The Sudanese Army gained full control over Merowe by April 21.

== Aftermath ==
The RSF claimed on April 17 to aid in efforts to repatriate the Egyptian prisoners of war. However, the group announced that they had moved the soldiers to Khartoum on April 19 and would hand them over when the "appropriate opportunity" arose. Of the 204 Egyptian troops taken prisoner, 177 were flown back to Egypt that same day. The remaining 27 soldiers sheltered at the Egyptian embassy in Khartoum.

On 29 November 2024, the SAF claimed that the RSF used 16 suicide drones in an attempt to attack the airport. SAF states that all 16 suicide drones have been destroyed.

On 28 February 2025, an RSF drone strike on the Merowe Power Station led to a power outage in the city.
