= Merowe Airport =

Airport in Merowe, Sudan

- IATA: MWE; ICAO: HSMN

Summary
- Airport type: Public
- Serves: Merowe
- Elevation AMSL: 899 ft (274 m)
- Coordinates: 18°26′35″N 31°50′35″E

Map
- Location of the airport in Sudan

Runways
Direction	Length		Surface
Direction	ft	m	Surface
02/20	13,190	4,020	Asphalt
- Source: Google Maps GCM

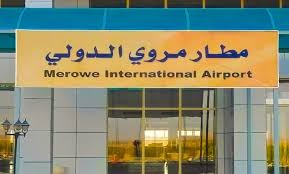
Sudan Meroe International Airport

Merowe Airport (IATA: MWE, ICAO: HSMN) is an airport serving the town of Merowe in Sudan. After critical facilities were completed in 2006, the current airport replaced the smaller Merowe Town airport 3 kilometres (1.9 mi) to the west. The new Merowe airport has hosted Sudanese Air Force jet fighters, but does not host any full time units stationed.

The airport was attacked during the Sudanese civil war (2023), where RSF militias captured Egyptian soldiers who were serving joint military exercises with their Sudanese counterparts. Later, on 27 April 2024, the SAF claimed to have shot down three drones targeting the airport.

== Airlines and destinations ==
Airlines	Destinations
Nova Airways	Khartoum (suspended)

== See also ==
- Transport in Sudan
