= Dongolawi language =

Nubian language spoken in northern Sudan

Dongolawi
- Andaandi
- Native to: Sudan
- Region: Nile River
- Ethnicity: Danagla
- Native speakers: 35,000 (2023)
- Language family: Nilo-Saharan?: Eastern Sudanic; Northern Eastern; Nubian; Central; Dongolawi
- Writing system: Coptic script (Old Nubian variant); Latin alphabet Arabic alphabet

Language codes
- ISO 639-3: dgl
- Glottolog: dong1288

Dongolawi is a Nubian language of northern Sudan. It is spoken by a minority of the Danagla people in the Nile Valley, from roughly south of Kerma upstream to the bend in the Nile near al Dabbah, Sudan.

Dongolawi is an Arabic term based on the town of Old Dongola, the centre of the historic Christian kingdom of Makuria (6th to 14th century). Today's Dongola was founded during the 19th century on the western side of the Nile. The Dongolawi call their language Andaandi [andaːndi] "the language of our home".

Nearly all Dongolawi speakers are also speakers of Sudanese Arabic, the lingua franca of Sudan. Arabic–Dongolawi bilingualism is replacive in the sense that Dongolawi is threatened by complete replacement by Arabic (Jakobi 2008).

Dongolawi is closely related to Kenzi (Mattokki), spoken in southern Egypt. They were once considered dialects of a single language, Kenzi-Dongolawi. More recent research recognises them as distinct languages without a "particularly close genetic relationship." Apart from these two languages spoken along the Nile, three extinct varieties were included under Kenzi-Dongolawi.
