= Merowe Dam =

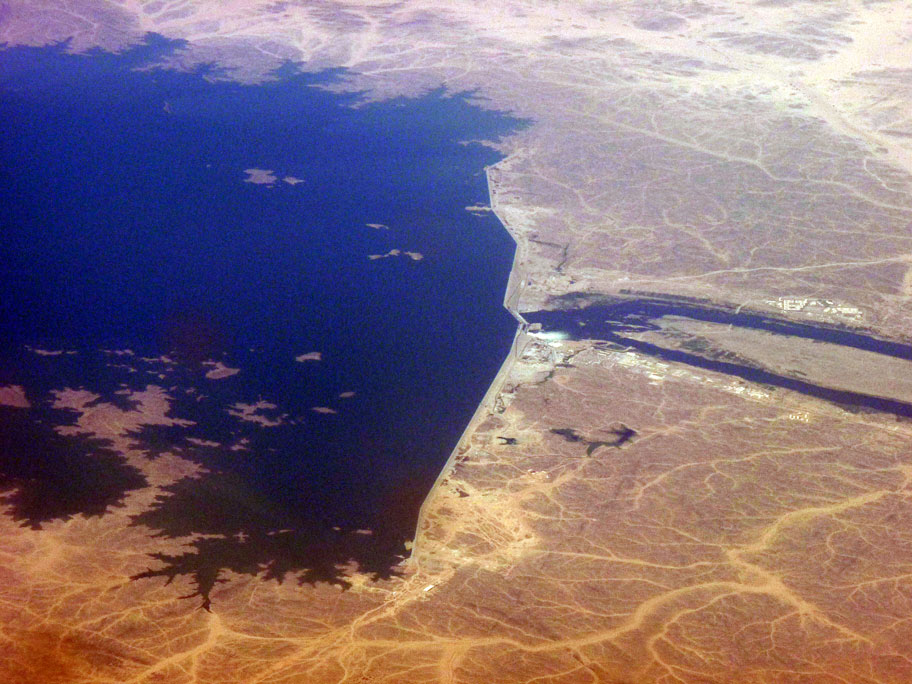

- Location in Sudan
- Location: Merowe, Sudan
- Coordinates: 18°40′08″N 32°03′01″E
- Status: Operational
- Construction began: 2004
- Opening date: March 3, 2009
- Construction cost: €1.2 billion

Dam and spillways
- Impounds: River Nile
- Height: 67 m (220 ft)
- Length: 9 km (5.6 mi)

Reservoir
- Creates: Merowe Reservoir
- Total capacity: 12.5 km^{3} (10,100,000 acre⋅ft)
- Surface area: 476 km^{2}

Power Station
- Turbines: 10 × 125 MW (168,000 hp) Francis-type
- Installed capacity: 1,250 MW (1,680,000 hp)
- Annual generation: 5.5 TWh (20 PJ)
- Website http://www.merowedam.gov.sd/

The Merowe Dam, also known as Merowe High Dam, Merowe Multi-Purpose Hydro Project or Hamdab Dam, is a large dam near Merowe Town in northern Sudan, about 350 kilometres (220 mi) north of the capital Khartoum. Its dimensions make it the largest contemporary hydropower project in Africa. It is situated on the river Nile, close to and inundating the 4th Cataract where the river divides into multiple smaller branches with large islands in between. Merowe is a city about 40 kilometres (25 mi) downstream from the construction site at Hamdab. The main purpose for building the dam was the generation of electricity.

== Technical details ==
The dam has a length of about 9 kilometres (5.6 mi) and a crest height of up to 67 metres (220 ft). It consists of concrete-faced rockfill dams on each river bank (the right bank dam is the largest part of the project, 4.3 km long and 53m high; the left bank is 1590 metres long and 50 metres high), an 883-metre (2,897 ft)-long 67-metre (220 ft)-high earth-core rockfill dam (the 'main dam') in the left river channel, and a live water section in the right river channel (sluices, spillway and a 300-metre power intake dam with turbine housings). It contains a reservoir of 12.5 cubic kilometres (10,100,000 acre⋅ft), or about 15% of the Nile's annual flow of 84 cubic kilometres (68,000,000 acre⋅ft); the intended reservoir level is 300 metres above sea level, with the Nile level downstream of the dam being about 265 metres. The reservoir lake is planned to extend 174 kilometres (108 mi) upstream.

== Powerhouse ==
The powerhouse is equipped with ten 125 megawatts (168,000 hp) Francis turbines, each one designed for a nominal discharge rate of 300 cubic metres per second, and each one driving a 150 MVA, 15 kV synchronous generator. The planners expect an annual electricity yield of 5.5 terawatt-hours (20 PJ), corresponding to an average load of 625 megawatts (838,000 hp), or 50% of the rated load. To utilize the extra generation capacity, the Sudanese power grid will be upgraded and extended as part of the project, with about 500 kilometres (310 mi) of new 500 kV aerial transmission line across the Bayudah Desert to Atbara, continuing to Omdurman/Khartoum, as well as about 1,000 kilometres (620 mi) of 220 kV lines eastwards to Port Sudan and westwards along the Nile, connecting to Merowe, Dabba and Dongola.

== Planning and construction ==
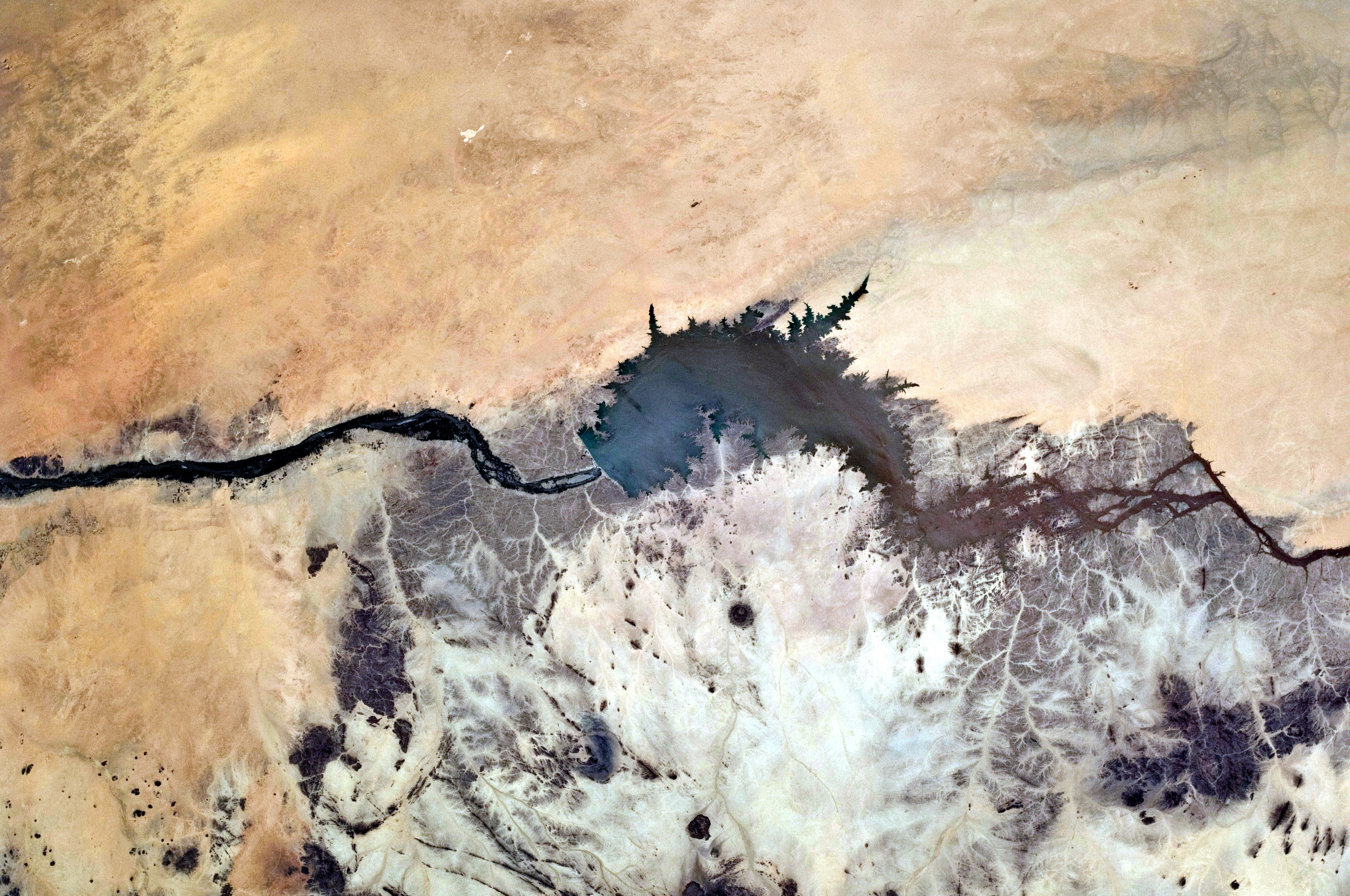
Astronaut photograph of Merowe Dam

The idea of a Nile dam at the 4th cataract is quite old. The authorities of the Anglo-Egyptian Sudan proposed it several times during the first half of the 20th century. It was supposed to equalize the large annual Nile flow fluctuations, create the possibility of growing cotton and provide flood protection for the lower Nile valley. After Sudan achieved independence in 1956, Egypt decided to control the flow of Nile water that reached its own territory by building a dam and creating a reservoir —the Aswan Dam and Nasser Lake.

The Sudan military government under President Nimeiri revived the plan in 1979, now with the intention of producing hydroelectricity for Sudan's rising demand. The following decade saw international industry and planning offices busy, producing a total of four feasibility studies [1 - Coyne et Bellier, 1979 / Gibb, Merz & McLellan, GB, 1983 / Sweco, SE, 1984 / Monenco Consultants Ltd., CA, 1989]. However, insufficient funding and lack of investor interest effectively stalled the project at the planning stage.

This appears to have changed fundamentally since the country started exporting oil in commercial quantities in the years 1999/2000. A greatly improved creditworthiness brought an influx of foreign investment, and the contracts for the construction of what is now known as the Merowe Dam project were signed in 2002 and 2003.

The main contractors are:

- China International Water&Electric Corp., China National Water Resources and Hydropower Engineering Corp. (construction of dam, hydromechanical works)
- Lahmeyer International (Germany - planning, project management, civil engineering)
- Alstom (France - generators, turbines)
- Harbin Power Engineering Company, Jilin Province Transmission and Substation Project Company (both China - transmission system extension)

By the time the contracts were signed, the Merowe Dam had been the largest international project the Chinese industry ever participated in.

River diversion and work on the concrete dams began in early 2004. The left river channel was closed on 30 December 2005; the project timeline scheduled the reservoir impounding to start in mid-2006 and the first generating unit to go on-line in mid-2007. The dam was inaugurated on March 3, 2009, at which point the reservoir was full and all the hydro-electric generating capacity on-line.

== Financing ==
The total project cost is reported to be $2.945 billion. This can be subdivided into partial amounts for the construction work on the dam itself (ca. 45%), its technical equipment (ca. 25%) and the necessary upgrade of the power transmission system (ca. 30%). The project receives funding from

- China Import Export Bank - USD 608 million
- Arab Fund for Economic and Social Development – USD 477 million
- Saudi Fund for Development – USD 215 million
- Abu Dhabi Fund for Development – USD 210 million
- Kuwait Fund for Arab Economic Development – USD 200 million
- Oman Fund for Development - USD 106 million
- State of Qatar - USD 15 million
- The remaining cost – $ 1.114 billion – is covered by the Sudanese government.

== Benefits ==
The electrification level in Sudan is very low, even by the standards of the region. In 2002, the average Sudanese consumed 58 kWh of electricity per year, i.e., about one fifteenth of their Egyptian neighbors to the north, and less than one hundredth of the OECD average. The capital Khartoum and a few large plantations account for more than two thirds of the country's electric power demand, while most of the rural areas are not connected to the national grid. Many villages use the option of connecting small generators to the ubiquitous diesel-powered irrigation pumps. This way of generating electricity is rather inefficient and expensive.

The combined grid-connected generating capacity in Sudan was 728 MW in 2002, about 45% hydroelectricity and 55% oil-fired thermal plants. However, the effective capacity has always been a lot lower. The two main facilities, the Sennar (constructed in 1925) and Roseires (1966) dams on the Blue Nile, were originally designed for irrigation purposes rather than power production. Generating units were added during the 1960s and 1970s when the demand for electric power increased, but their power production is often heavily restricted by irrigation needs.

The government in Khartoum has announced plans to raise the country's electrification level from an estimated 30% to about 90% in the mid-term. Large investments into the medium and low voltage distribution grids will be necessary but not sufficient to reach this ambitious goal: First and foremost, the foreseeable increase in power consumption would require the addition of generating capacity. During the 1990s, Sudanese electricity customers have already been plagued by frequent blackouts and brownouts due to insufficient generation. Three new thermal power plants went into operation in the Khartoum area in 2004, increasing the installed capacity to 1315 MW. The Merowe dam with its peak output of 1250 MW will almost double this capacity once it comes online.

== Human impact ==
=== Resettlement and compensation ===
Before the construction began, an estimated 55,000 to 70,000 people were resident in the area covered by the reservoir lake, mainly belonging to the Manasir, Hamadab and Amri tribes. They lived in small farming villages along the banks of the Nile and on the islands in the cataract. The whole region was relatively isolated, without paved roads or other infrastructure, and the communities were largely self-sufficient. Except for beans and millet the farmers grew vegetables, both for their own consumption and for trading at the weekly regional markets. However, their main source of income—and their most valuable possession—were the groves of date palms growing in the fertile silt on the river banks.

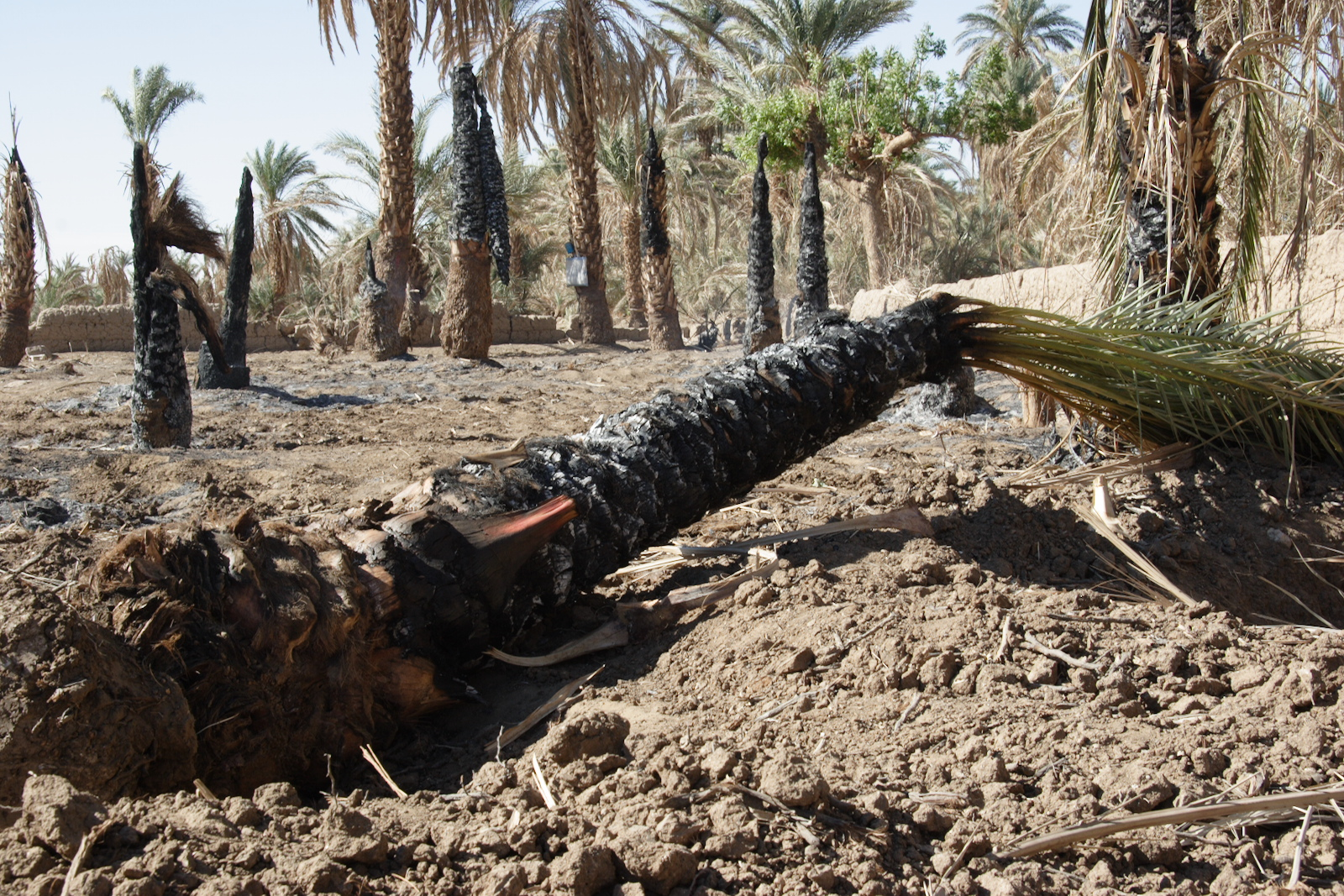
During relocation of the Manasir from Dar al-Manasir ahead of the flooding their villages were destroyed and compensated palm trees were burned

The inhabitants of the region to be flooded were forcibly displaced along a timeline corresponding to their land's proximity to the dam site: the people of Hamadab to Al-Multaga in 2003, the people of Amri to Wadi Muqaddam in 2007, and the Manasir to Al-Mokabrab and Al-Fidah in 2008. At the resettlement sites, farmers received plots of land relative in size to their former possessions, in addition to financial compensation for lost assets—houses and date palms. However, a majority preferred to stay near to their old grounds as possible and have thus built at the shores of the new lake. Many families have defied resettlement and live now on the margins of the lake. Farmers have become fishermen, but their income is less than before.

Though government officials claim there are improved living conditions at the resettlement areas, with relatively modern buildings and infrastructure, affected people reject the compensation plans. Their main objections are:

- The soil at the resettlement areas is sandy, and its quality is extremely poor, compared to the excellent farmland beside the Nile. It would take much effort and a long time—probably decades—until it became fertile enough for growing vegetables and other marketable produce.
- The government announced that it would provide free water, sand removal and fertilizer during the first two years after the resettlement. After this period, the farmers would have to pay the full price for these services, none of which had to be paid at the old site.
- Compensation for a date palm amounts to about four years' harvest, while a good palm tree can bear fruit for a hundred years. Compensation for vegetable gardens is very low, and only married men will receive compensation for their houses.

About 6,000 people were resettled to the Al-Multaqah site in the Nubian desert during 2003 and 2004. Their villages were the closest to the dam construction site near Hamdab. According to a survey conducted in early 2005, the poverty rate has increased dramatically because the farmers are not able to produce anything saleable in the local markets.

=== Nomads ===
A significant fraction of the Manasir tribe inhabits the desert regions close to the Nile valley. The exact size of this nomadic population is unknown, but it is estimated to be of the same order of magnitude as that of the resident farmers, i.e., tens of thousands. Both groups maintain tight cultural interchanges and trade relations with each other.

Only the owners of real estate purportedly are covered under the compensation scheme, although reports are that families have been displaced without compensation or adequate provisions for relocation. Nomadic families will not receive any compensation, even though the resettlement of the farming Manasir will deprive them of their symbiotic partners. The consequences for their ability to sustain their lives in a harsh environment remains to be assessed.

== Human rights concerns ==
UN Special Rapporteur on Adequate Housing Miloon Kothari issued a statement August 27,[2007], calling for a halt to dam construction at Merowe until an independent assessment of the dam's impacts on the more than 60,000 people who stand to be displaced by the dams at Merowe and Kajbar. Kothari stated he has "received reports that the Merowe reservoir's water levels have already risen, destroying dozens of homes in the area and putting many more at risk."

Kothari announced, "The affected people have claimed that they received no warning that water levels would be raised and that no assistance from Government authorities has been forthcoming since their houses were destroyed." According to reports, the Government of Sudan has not honored its promises to those who have been displaced. Kothari noted that, "thousands of people in the same area were relocated in similar circumstances that left many temporarily without food or shelter, and that some of those people remain homeless today." Kothari called upon the Sudanese government to ensure safety and adequate housing to all those affected by the dams and warned the projects "would lead to large-scale forced evictions and further violence."

== Archaeology ==
The fertile Nile valley has been attracting human settlement for thousands of years. The section between the 4th and 5th cataract—a significant portion of which will be inundated by the reservoir lake—has been densely populated through nearly all periods of (pre)history, but very little archaeological work has ever been conducted in this particular region. Recent surveys have confirmed the richness and diversity of traceable remains, from the Stone Age to the Islamic period.

Several foreign institutions have been recently or are currently involved in salvage archaeology in the region under the umbrella Merowe Dam Archaeological Salvage Project (MDASP). Among them are ACACIA project University of Cologne, Gdańsk Archaeological Museum Expedition (GAME), Polish Academy of Sciences, Humboldt University of Berlin, the Italian Institute for Africa and the Orient (IsIAO), the University College London, the Sudan Archaeological Research Society, the Hungarian Meroe Foundation, University of California at Santa Barbara - Arizona State University consortium, and the Oriental Institute Museum of the University of Chicago.

Their main problems are the shortness of the remaining time and limited funding. Unlike the large UNESCO campaign conducted in Egypt before the completion of the Aswan High Dam, when more than a thousand archaeological sites could be documented and complete buildings were moved to prevent them from drowning in Lake Nasser's floods, work at the 4th cataract is much more restricted.

Since 2006, the archaeologists working for the Merowe Dam Archaeological Salvage Project became accused by environmental and human rights activists as well as the representatives of the affected people of facilitating the political legitimatization of the project. The archaeologists working for the dam project found themselves in an ethical dilemma since they were undertaking salvage excavations while the local people were in opposition to the building of the dam that necessitates both their resettlement and the archaeological campaign.

Historian Runoko Rashidi issued a statement in solidarity with Sudanese Nubians protesting the dams and called for a halt to their construction.

We have never forgotten the terrible tragedy resulting from the Aswan High Dam in Egyptian Nubia. The project in Sudanese Nubia, which we call the "damn dams", will perpetuate yet another tragedy, another atrocity, against African people. Nubia is a treasure-house of artifacts that attest to the ancient greatness of Africa. For it to be inundated will cause irreparable harm to a noble heritage. We must organize to resist this project. One of the great figures among Africans in America, Frederick Douglass, said that "power concedes nothing without demand. It never did, and it never will."

== Political impact ==
=== International ===
Usage rights to the waters of the Nile are fixed in the Nile Waters Treaty, negotiated by the British in 1959. It allots 82 percent of the water volume to Egypt, while Sudan is granted the rights to the remaining 18 percent. None of the riparian countries further upstream in the Nile basin—Ethiopia, Uganda, Rwanda, Burundi, Kenya and Tanzania—are entitled to any significant use of the water, be it for irrigation (of particular interest to Ethiopia and Kenya) or hydropower (Rwanda, Burundi, Uganda).

As Sudan now pushes forward to make use of its water allotment, those countries have begun to call for a revision of the treaty, arguing that—with the exception of Ethiopia—they had all been under colonial rule at the time the negotiations took place, and had not been represented in their best interest. Moreover, the decision of distribution of water was made without any negotiations with Ethiopia, which had rejected the agreement and is the source of 90% of the water and 96% of transported sediment of the Nile.

=== Domestic ===
While a peace treaty appears to have stopped the fighting in Southern Sudan after almost 20 years, there is no end in sight yet for the civil war in Darfur. More recently, unrest in Nubia as a direct result of the dams and the forced permanent displacement of Nubians from their homelands threatens to erupt into war. A group calling itself the Nubian Liberation Front is threatening armed resistance in order to thwart the series of dams along the Nile, and particularly at Kajbar.

During the Sudanese civil war (2023–present) on 13 January 2025, the dam's power station was damaged by RSF drones, causing a fire at the facility and damaging a key transformer. The attack also caused power outages as far as Shendi, Port Sudan, Atbara and Omdurman.

== Environmental impact ==
=== Health ===
The resettlement area is a vast area with an expected 50,000–70,000 inhabitants who would be going through a transitional period for a few years before the get acclimatised and psychologically adapted to their new life. Governing by the two eminent health impact experiences of New Halfa resettlement projects and Aswan Dam in Egypt, strategic health planning ought to start early to foresee what water born diseases and other ecological health problems (such as bilharziasis, malaria) are likely to prevail and to plan how to guard against that.

=== Evaporation ===
The creation of the reservoir lake will increase the surface area of the Nile by about 700 km^{2}. Under the climatic conditions at the site, additional evaporation losses of up to 1,500,000,000 m^{3} per year can be expected. This corresponds to about 8% of the total amount of water allocated to Sudan in the Nile Waters Treaty.

== See also ==
- List of conventional hydroelectric power stations
- List of power stations in Sudan
