= Delgo, Sudan =

Settlement in Northern Province, Sudan

Delgo دلقو
- Location in Sudan
- Coordinates: 20°07′N 30°34′E
- Country: Sudan
- State: Northern

Delgo (Arabic: دلقو) is a settlement in Northern Province, Sudan. The settlement is located on the east bank of the Nile River on the A1 Highway from Dongola to Wadi Halfa.

Kitchener's railroad formerly passed through the town, and the rail embankment is still clearly visible. The British had a district office at Delgo, but later downgraded it to a police post. Opposite from Delgo on the west bank of the Nile is the site of the ancient Nubian town of Sesibi where Amenhotep IV built a temple.
