= Kajbar Power Station =

Proposed dam in northern Sudan

Kajbar Dam
- Country: Sudan
- Location: Northern State
- Coordinates: 19°56′24″N 30°25′51″E
- Purpose: Power
- Status: Proposed
- Construction cost: $700 m

Dam and spillways
- Impounds: Nile River
- Height (thalweg): 20 m

Reservoir
- Surface area: 110 km^{2}

Power Station
- Turbines: 6 x 60 MW
- Installed capacity: 360 MW

The Kajbar Power Station is a proposed hydroelectric power plant on the Nile in northern Sudan. Flooding the third cataract, it will have a power generating capacity of 360 MW, enough to power over 202,000 homes. Among other goals, the dam aims at facilitating heavy industry implantation in the area by its power generation.

Kajbar power station is part of a larger hydropower generation programme all along the Nile in Sudan, that also includes the Merowe dam (completed in 2009), Shreiq dam and Dal dam (proposed).

As of 2020, the project is stalled and the expected completion date is unknown.

== Opposition ==
Kajbar hydropower project has encountered a massive opposition from local communities, most of them belonging to the threatened Nubian minority. The reservoir created by Kajbar dam would flood 110 km^{2} of the Nile valley, requiring the relocation of 10,000 people from 10 to 12 villages, along with the submersion of some 500 archaeological sites. As a consequence, several protests against the project have occurred since the 2000s, some of them being violently repressed such as in 2007.

Initially expected for completion by 2016, the project has been stalled due to strong opposition, and no significant progress had been made as of 2020.
