= Mahas =

Nobiin-speaking Nubian subgroup in Sudan

The Mahas (Arabic: المحس) are a sub-group of the Nubian people located in Southern Egypt and Northern Sudan along the banks of the Nile. For millennia, the Mahas tribe had resided in the region that constitutes present day north Sudan. Little arable land and finite rainfall lead the Mahas, and other residents of the area, to migrate from the area. As early as the late 1400s to the early 1500s, following the end of the Mamluke Sultanate in Egypt and the Christian kingdom in Nubia, the Mahas ethnic group began to migrate. The Mahas migrants settled in the “Three Towns” area, the present-day cities of Khartoum, Khartoum North, and Omdurman, and along the Blue Nile. Arkell insinuates that the Mahas acquired land in the “Three Towns” area and Tuti Island from the Jummu’iya tribe. When the Mahas had arrived, the area was already inhabited by the Rufa’a, Ja’aliyin, Shayqia, and Jummu’iya peoples.

The Mahas in the “Three Towns” are largely from Nubian descent. Lobban argues that they are of the completely Arabized Nubians. The Mahas of this stock do not maintain strong ties with the Nubians in the north and east. They know little of the Nubian language. Inhabiting the north of Sudan and south of Egypt at a time when Islam was expanding south up the Nile, the Mahas of this group were Arabized relatively early. As Mahas families became established in the Three Towns, they were almost exclusively of Mahas descent. The Three Towns area was composed of Nubian, Arab, Sudanic, Nilotic, and European groups. However, within the Mahas communities, there was a strong inclination for preserving the Mahas lineage. Marriage was predominately between the Arab communities in the Nile valley. It was rare to encounter marriages between the Mahas communities and the Sudanese Darfuris and southern regions of present-day Sudan. The emphasis of cultural homogeneity within the Mahas communities was strengthened with Islamic values at that time that perpetuated egalitarianism.

At that time, traditional society embraced socio-economic differences among the people of the region. Servants, former slaves, and farmworkers from the west and south of Sudan constituted the bottom of the hierarchy. Among the Mahas, there was different access to power at the top. Some Mahas family groups brought in a substantial amount of turnover through agricultural land holdings. Other Mahas groups saw religious advisors, omdas (mayors), and high-ranking military officers, business men, and public servants as the conflux of power.

The Mahas community established at Tuti Island, at the convergence of the Blue and White Nile, is among the oldest Mahas communities. The Mahas have occupied their site on Tuti Island for about five hundred years. The site is exclusively homogenous to the Mahas. In the 15th century, The Mahas fukahaa of Tuti were seen as key to the Islamization of Sudan. As the first to build permanent structures in the Khartoum area, the Mahas may be credited with initiating the modernization of Sudan. The “Three Towns” area is the current center of modern-day Sudan.

By the early 16th century, the Mahas ethnic community were established in the area. Most of the Mahas communities were established by a prominent Muslim scholar and leader called the fukahaa. Each fukahaa would bring their respective families to the site of the community. In addition to the home the family would build, there would also be a religious school, or khalwa. As the community grew, it would include multiple homes, the khalwa, and the local mesjid, or mosque. When the founding scholar died, a typical Mahas community would also include a gubba, or tomb, that would be the center of the municipal's cemetery. For larger Mahas villages, there would often be a market and areas for craft specialization whereas the inhabitants of the community could sell, exchange, and buy crafts, livestock, and various produce.

Several prominent Mahas figures gave rise to the “Three Towns” area. In 1691, Sheikh Arbab El Agyed established a community and Islamic regional center in Khartoum. Born in Tuti island around the 17th century, Agayed was related to Mohammed Busati, a religious scholar responsible for spreading Islam in the state of Kordofan. The khalwa he established attracted around 500 students, 300 of them being Nubians. The masjid in the community lasted until the conquest of Sudan by the Turkish and Ottoman Empire. This community turned into the first permanent settlement in (western) Khartoum. The Mahas encountered the destruction of Agayed's masjid and community throughout Turkish rule. Today, the site is still remembered to be a couple of blocks south of the Blue Nile. It is said that around, or maybe later, than 1646, the Sheikh Hamad was born on Tuti Island. He was a part of the religious order and a student of the El Agyed. For reasons not known, the Sheikh moved to settle on the western bank of the White Nile. We see that his village and settlement on the White Nile as the first settlement of Omdurman.

Sheikj Idiris wad Muhammad el Arbab was one of the first Mahas fukahaa to serve as a religious advisor in the region. He is seen as the founder of the Qadriya tariqa, or way, in Sudan. He was considered to have magical powers that aligned with curing the sick, restoring youth, and curing sterility. He was famous for giving out roughly sixty plates of food to his followers who were in need every day. Because of his generous and exuberant reputation, he was awarded the acres of land that now constitute the Eilafun region in Khartoum.
