= 2016 World Monuments Watch =

The World Monuments Watch is a flagship advocacy program of the New York-based private non-profit organization World Monuments Fund (WMF) that calls international attention to cultural heritage around the world that is threatened by neglect, vandalism, conflict, or disaster.

== 2016 Watch List ==
The 2016 Watch List was published on 15 October 2015.

Country/Territory	Site	Location
Albania	Spaç Prison	Spaç
Belgium	Brussels Palace of Justice	Brussels
Brazil	Ladeira da Misericórdia	Salvador
Cambodia	National Sports Complex of Cambodia	Phnom Penh
Chile	Geoglyphs of Chug-Chug	Calama and Maria Elena Municipalities
Chile	General Cemetery of Santiago	Santiago
Cuba	Colonial Churches of Santiago de Cuba	Santiago de Cuba
Cuba	Vedado	Havana
Cuba	National Art Schools	Havana
Ecuador	Church and Convent of San Francisco	Quito
Egypt	Abusir el-Malek	Wasta
Greece	Pavlopetri	Elafonisos
India	Gon-Nila-Phuk Cave Temples and Fort	Saspol, Ladakh
Iraq	Amedy, Kurdistan Region	
Italy	Arch of Janus	Rome
Italy	World War II Concentration Camps in Italy	
Japan	Early Twentieth Century Architecture in Tsukiji	Tokyo
Jordan	Petra Archaeological Site	Wadi Mousa
Lebanon	Dalieh of Raouche	Beirut
Lebanon	Hneineh Palace	Beirut
Mauritius	Traditional Architecture of Mauritius	
Mexico	Antiguo Colegio de San Ildefonso	Mexico City
Mexico	Chapultepec Park	Mexico City
Morocco	Figuig	
Nepal	Cultural Heritage Sites of Nepal	
Panama	Fortifications of Portobelo	Portobelo
Peru	La Ermita de Barranco	Lima
Peru	Rumiqolqa	Andahuaylillas
Philippines	Boix House	Manila
Portugal	Água da Prata Aqueduct	Évora
Portugal	Igreja de São Cristóvão de Rio Mau	Lisbon
Romania	Bucharest	
Romania	Roșia Montană Mining Landscape	Roșia Montană
Russia	Shukhov Tower	Moscow
Russia	Vyborg Historic Center	Vyborg
Samoa	Former Apia Courthouse	Apia
Sierra Leone	Bunce Island	Sierra Leone River, near Freetown
South Africa	Bo-Kaap	Cape Town
South Korea	Simwonjeong Pavilion	Dongmyeong-myeon
Spain	Averly Foundry	Zaragoza
Spain	Convents of Seville	Seville
Sudan	Sabu-Jaddi Rock Art Sites	Nile Valley
Taiwan	Kucapungane	Wutai Township
Tanzania	Kua Ruins	Juani Island
United Kingdom	Moseley Road Baths	Birmingham
United Kingdom	Wentworth Woodhouse	South Yorkshire
United States	Mission San Xavier del Bac	Tucson
United States	San Esteban del Rey Mission	Acoma Pueblo
Zimbabwe	Great Zimbabwe	Masvingo Province
