= Sabu-Jaddi =

Site of prehistoric rock art in Northern Sudan

Sabu-Jaddi Rock Art site
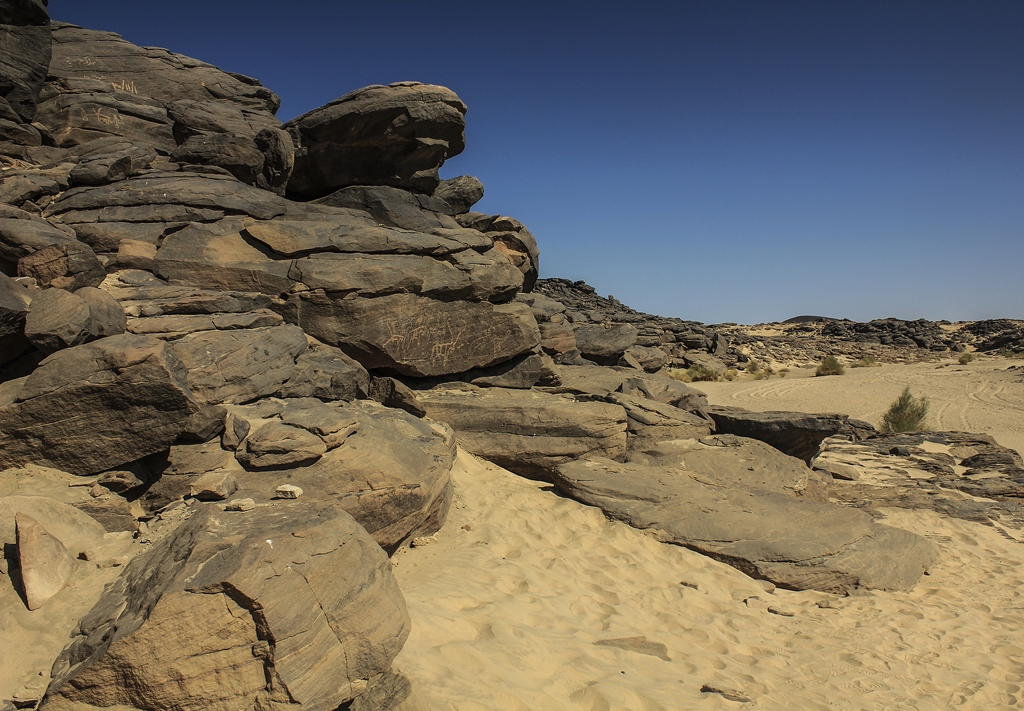
- Rock art in wadi Jaddi

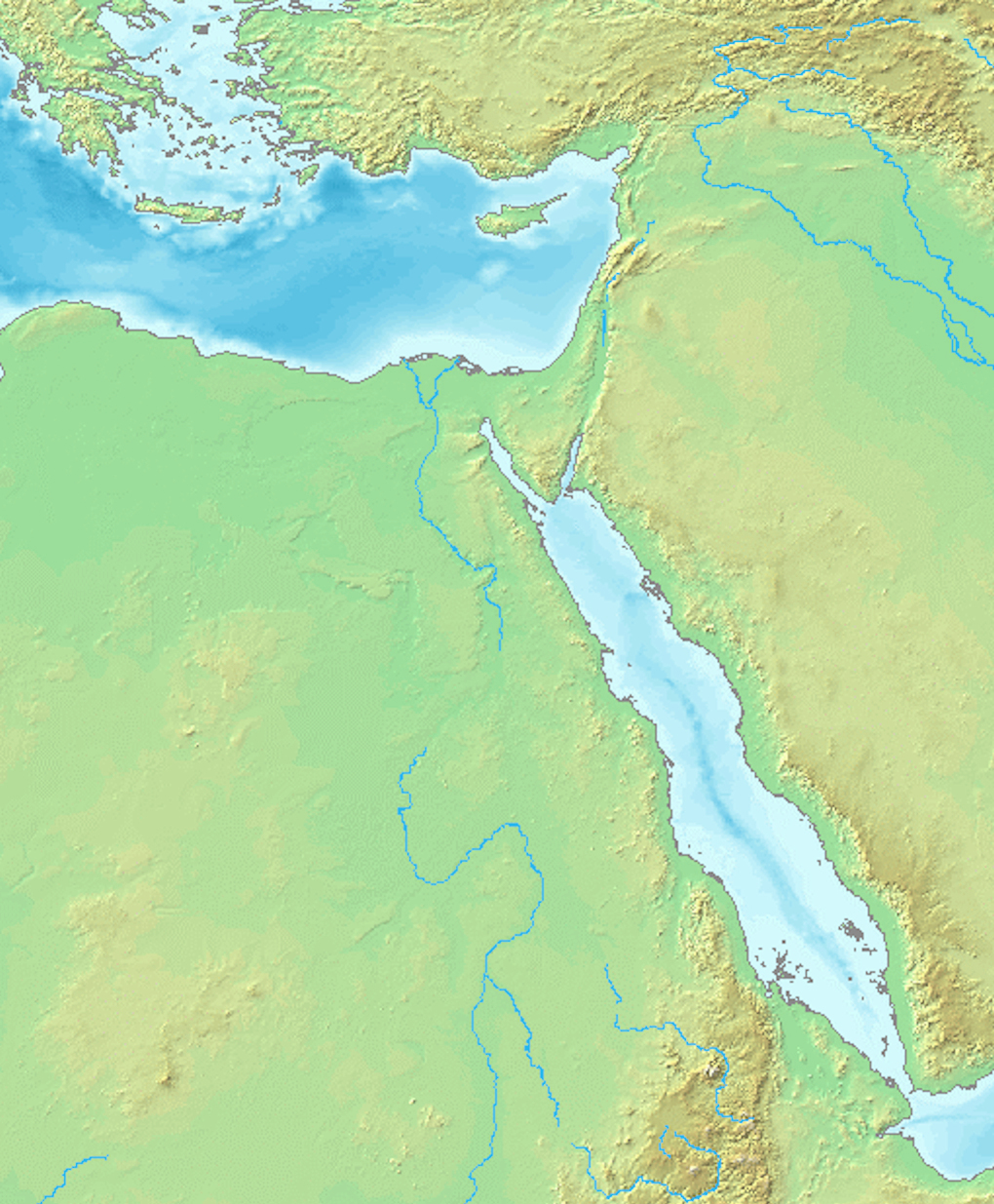
- Location within Northeast Africa Location within Sudan
- 19°55′30″N 30°32′30″E
- Periods: Neolithic
- Location: Sabu
- Region: Northern state, Sudan

The Sabu-Jaddi rock art site in Sudan is a unique cluster of more than 1600 rock drawings from different historical periods extending for more than 6000 years through different eras of Nubian civilisation. however, exactly when the people living in this region began creating these images is still unknown. The site is located 600 km north of Khartoum between the villages of Sabu and Jaddi. The well-preserved drawings include wild and domestic animals, humans and boats.

Due to the construction plans for Kajbar Power Station, the site was included in the 2016 World Monuments Watch List which contains endangered monuments that need attention, promotion, and protection.

== Geography ==
Located at the downstream end of the third cataract region on the east bank of the Nile, the rock drawings cover the rugged sandstone cliffs along the Nile bend between the villages of Sabu and Jaddi. Additional rock drawings are found along the edges of the narrow wadi Jaddi leading inland.

== Description ==
The drawings depict symbols, a large range of now extinct wild animals in the area like hippopotamus, crocodile, giraffe, leopard, antelope, scorpion and lion as well as domestic animals, mainly cattle and camels. Additionally, there are some human figures.

The game animals appear in a unnaturally-styled manner and are generally the surface is pecked over or hammered out. The elephants display both ears. The cattle are represented in a geometrically-designed manner, often with distorted corbels.

Located on subhorizontal slabs bordering the right bank of the wadi there are groups of rowing boats steered with oars. Two Nile boat types can be distinguished: curved-bottom boats and flat-bottomed boats with an erect stern and bow. On some boats, a pilot stands on the roof of the ship's cabin.

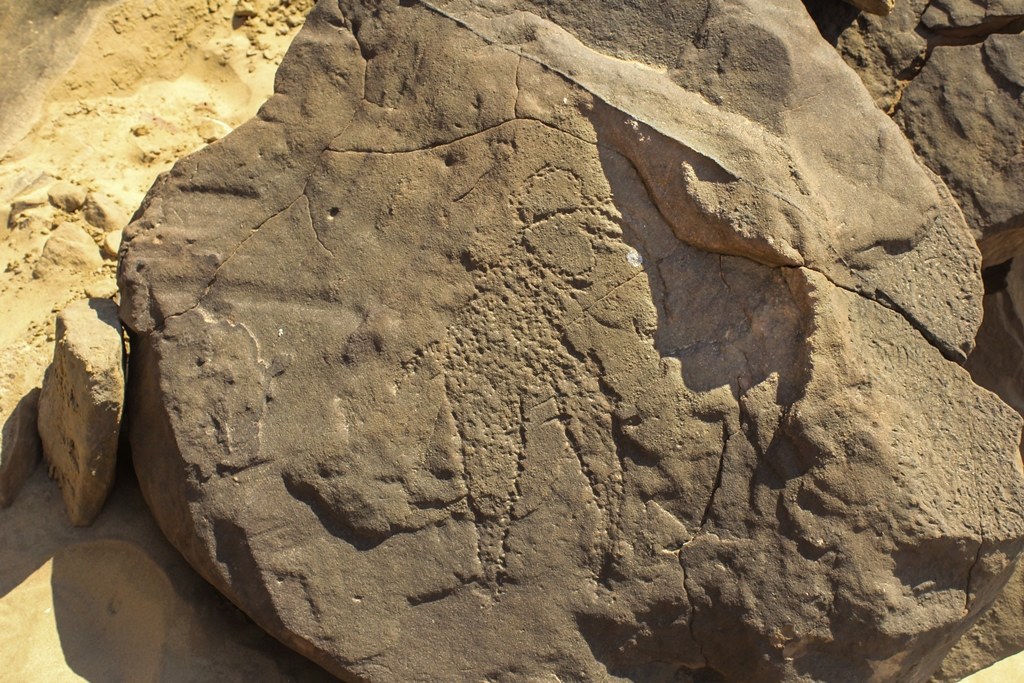
Deeply pecked elephant

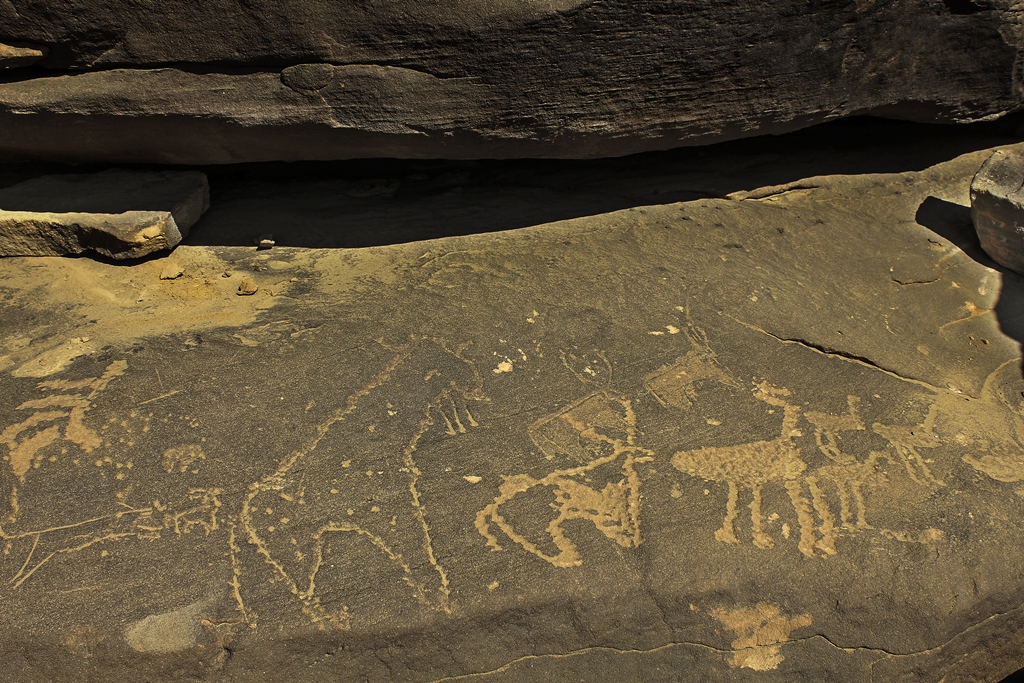
Dogs chasing a giraffe

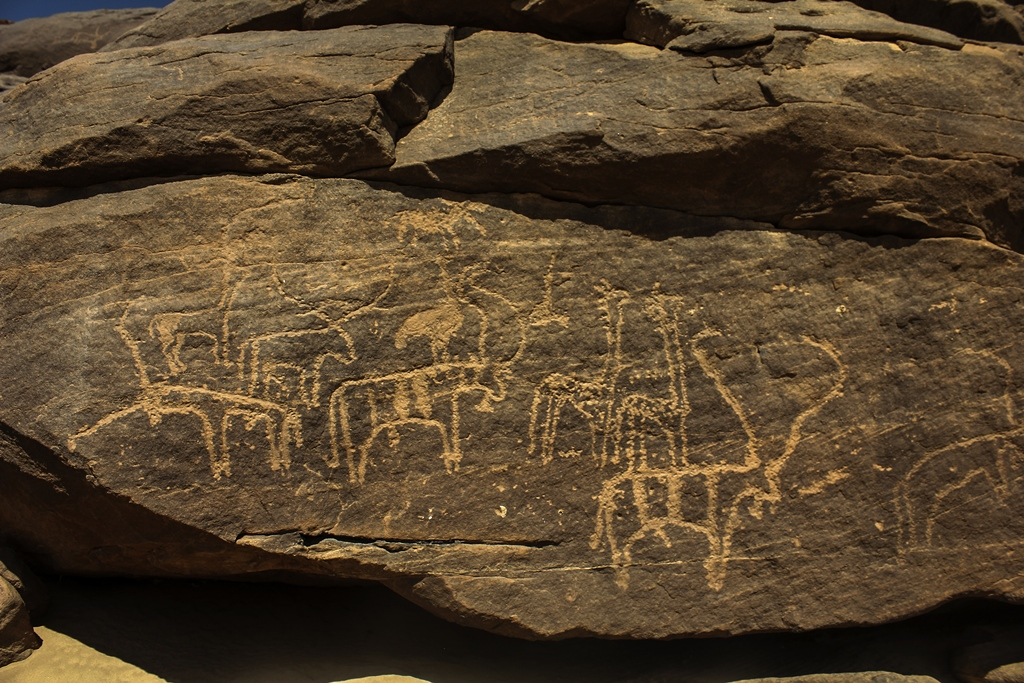
Cattle with distorted corbels

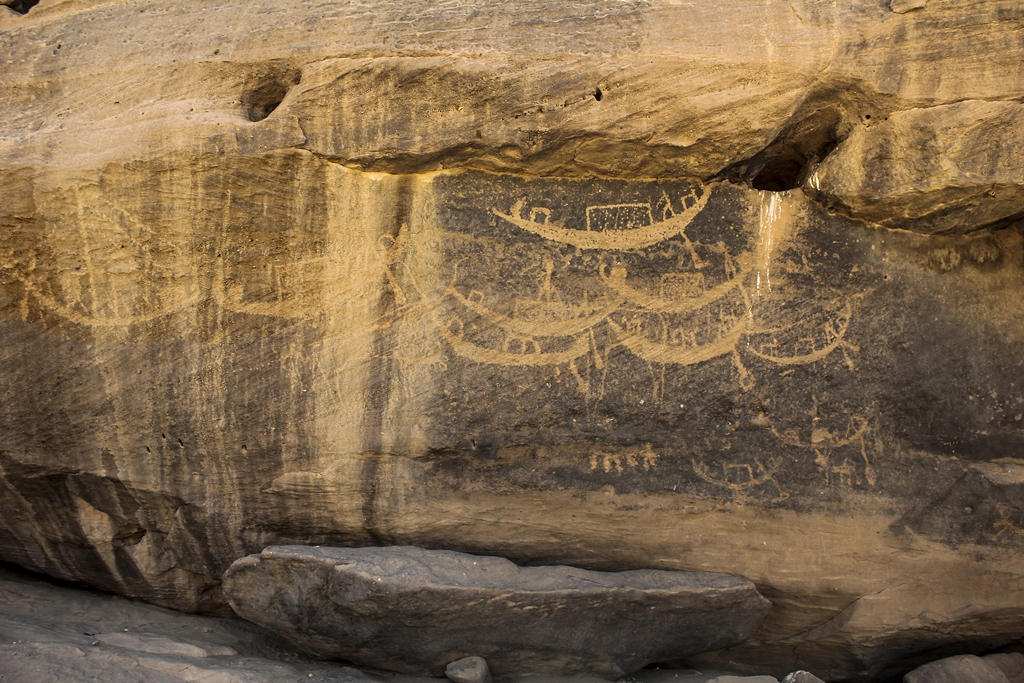
Nile boats
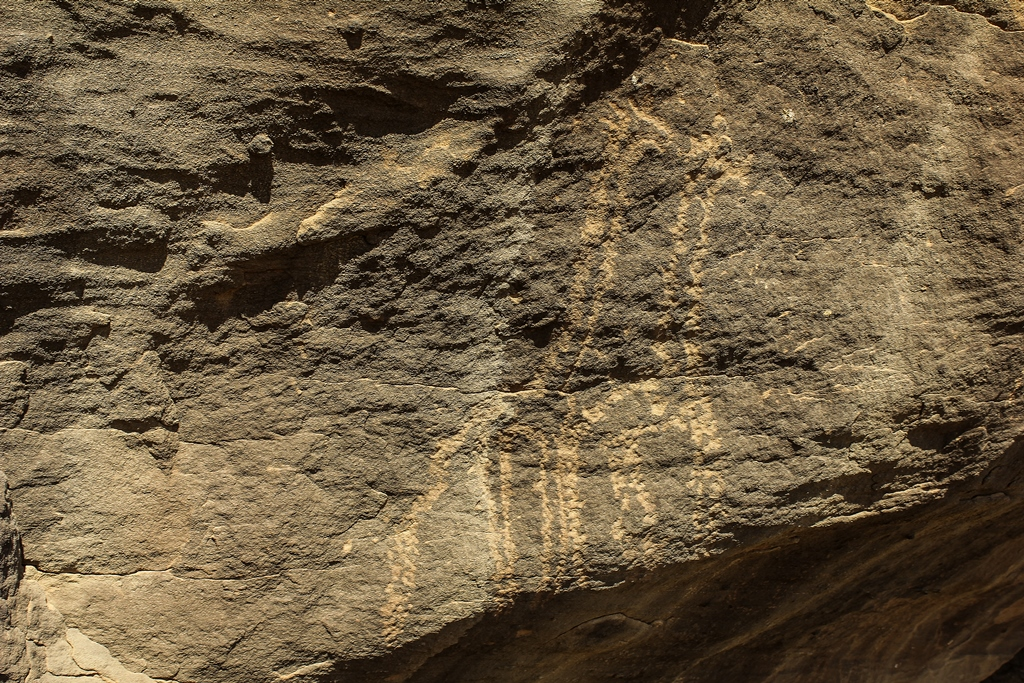
Giraffes

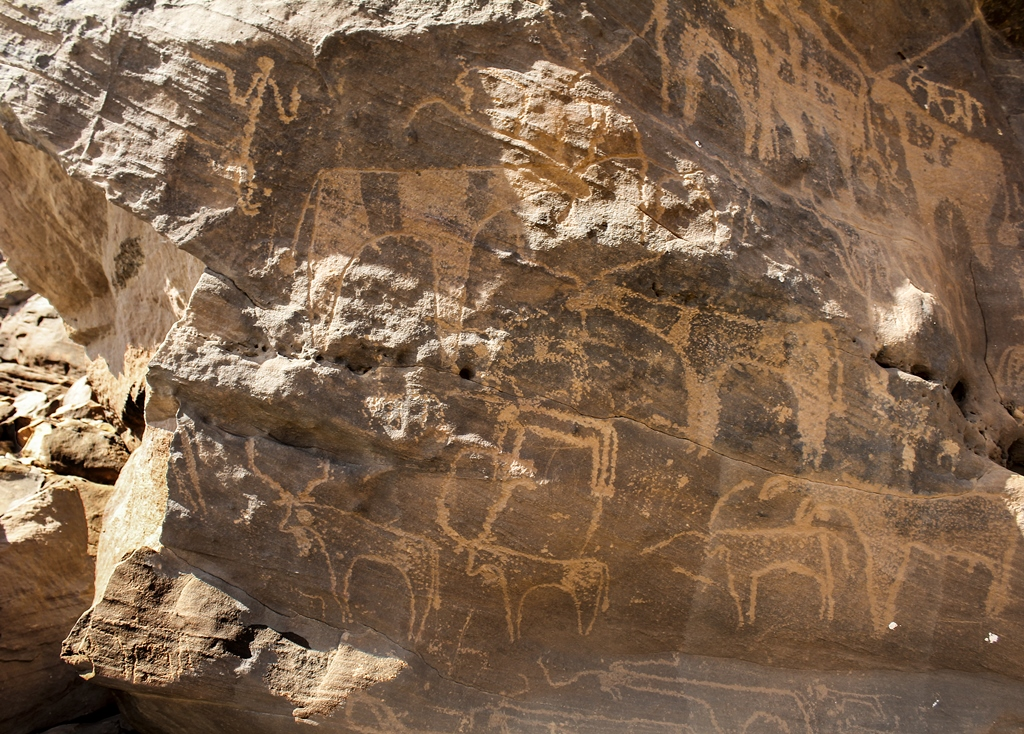
Livestock

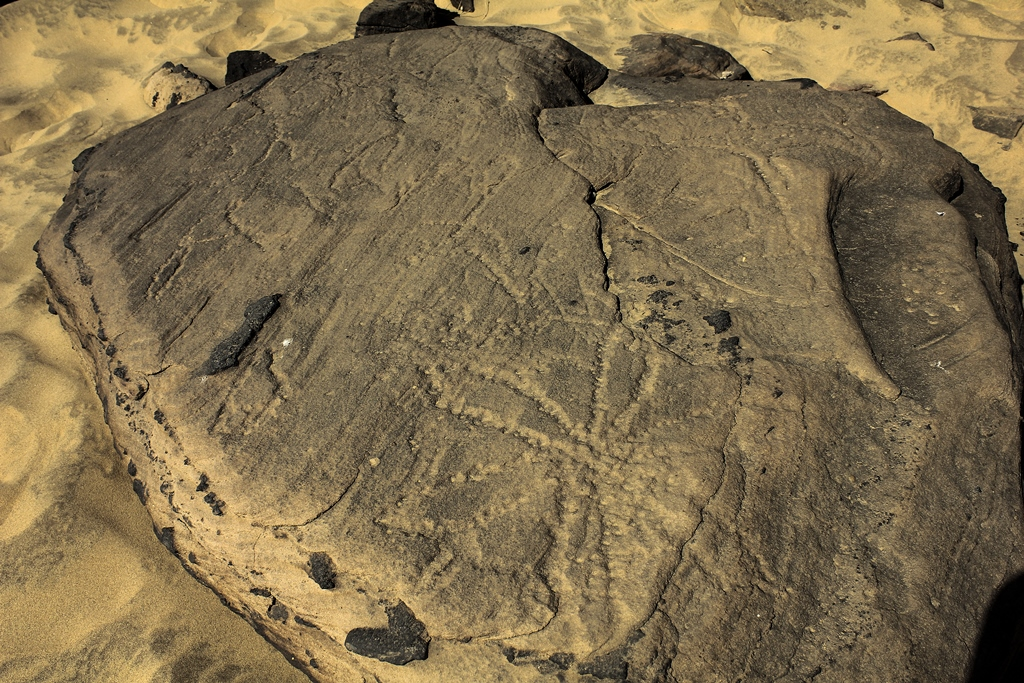
Deeply pecked symbols

== Bibliography ==
1. Neville Chittick: Rock engravings at Sabu, in: Kush 11: Journal of the Sudan Antiquities Service. 10, 1962, pages 328-332.
2. Karl-Heinz Otto; Gisela Buschendorf-Otto: Felsbilder aus dem sudanesischen Nubien, 1993.
3. David N. Edwards: Drawing on rocks, the most enduring monuments of Middle Nubia, in: Sudan & Nubia 10, 2006, pp. 55-63.
4. Hans Alexander Winkler, Sir Robert Mond: Rock-Drawings of southern Upper Egypt I. Sir Robert Mond Desert Expedition Season 1936-1937 Preliminary Report, London 1938.
5. Hans Alexander Winkler, Sir Robert Mond: Rock-Drawings of southern Upper Egypt II. Sir Robert Mond Desert Expedition Season 1937-1938 Preliminary Report, London 1939.
6. Anthony John Arkell: History of the Sudan to 1821, 1954.
