= Sabu, Sudan =

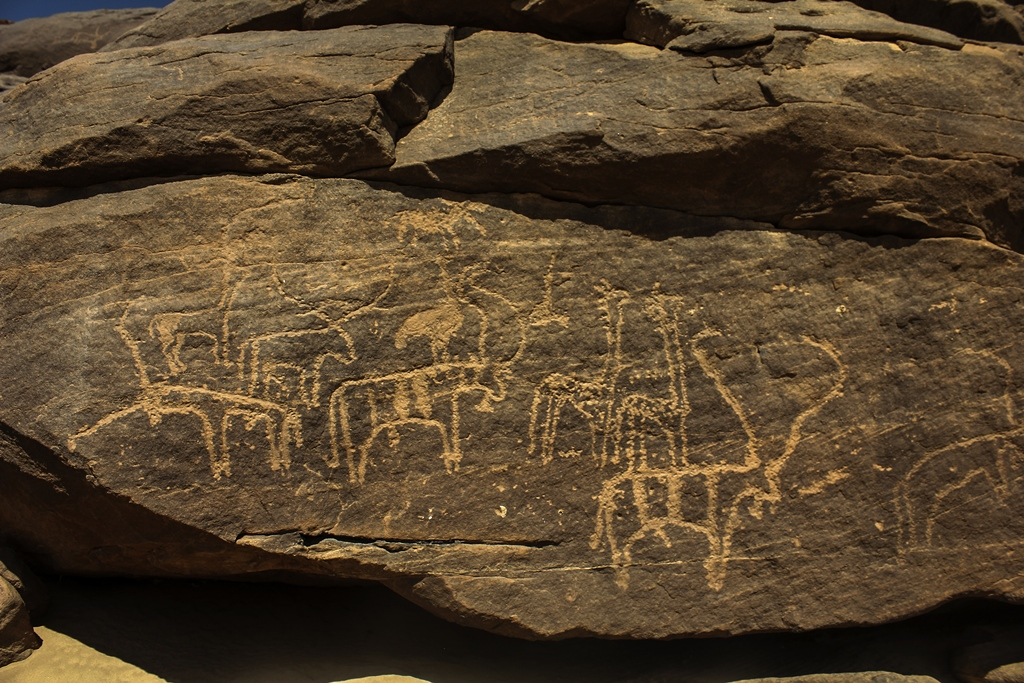
Sabu-Jaddi rock art: Cattle

Sabu is a village located in the Nile Valley of northern Sudan approximately 600 kilometres northwest of Khartoum. It is best known for the nearby Sabu-Jaddi site containing hundreds of Neolithic-era rock-art panels depicting giraffes, New Kingdom ships, and Christian churches. The site has yet to be systematically studied by archaeologists and is currently threatened by the $705 million Kajbar Dam project, which scientists say will flood the site within six years.

In October 2015 Sabu-Jaddi Rock Art sites were added to World Monuments Fund /Watch as one of 2016's 50 endangered monuments in 36 countries around the world to call the international attention to protect and promote these incredible heritage reservoirs. Little research has been done in these sites, The Mahas survey project of the university of Khartoum exposed some important information about the site located between Sabu and Jaddi.
