= Geoglyphs of Chug-Chug =

Coordinates: 22°14′54.70″S 69°10′42.54″W

The geoglyphs of Chug-Chug are a series of ancient geoglyphs located in the Atacama Desert in northern Chile, 70 km (43 mi) northeast of María Elena. The area includes 23 archaeological sites, preserving nearly 500 geoglyphs distributed along old caravan routes between the oasis of Calama and Quillagua, the base of an extinct pre-Hispanic town.

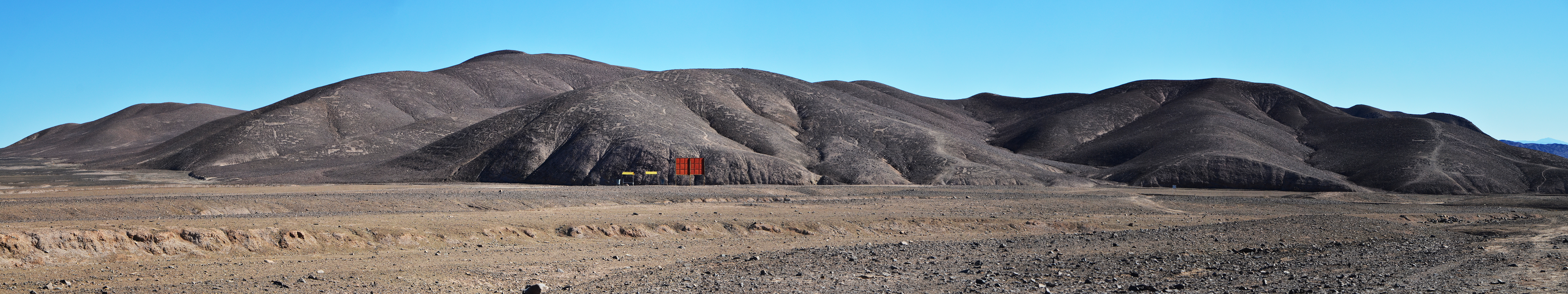
Geoglyphs of Chug-Chug, Chile

The oldest of the geoglyphs date back to 1000 BC, while most originated between 900 and 1550 AD, supposedly by the Atacama and Tarapacá tribes that inhabited the surrounding areas. Similar to the Nazca Lines, the geoglyphs of Chug-Chug include human figures, zoomorphic designs of animals such as birds and llamas and geometric figures like circles and rhombuses. The latter were probably used as signs for llama herders and traders to guide the caravans across the several trails.

The site and its geoglyphs prove the existence of communication between the lagoon areas and the Pacific Coast, showcasing a variety of representation of men on rafts and harpooning fishes.
