= Les Rougon-Macquart =

Cycle of twenty novels by Émile Zola

Les Rougon-Macquart, Histoire naturelle et sociale d'une famille sous le Second Empire
- First page of La Fortune des Rougon, the first book of the series
- 20 books, see this list
- Author: Émile Zola
- Country: France
- Language: French
- Genre: Naturalism
- Publisher: Lutetian Society and Oxford OUP
- Published: 1871–1893
- Media type: Print

Les Rougon-Macquart (French pronunciation: [le ʁuɡɔ̃ makaʁ]) is a literary cycle of twenty novels by French writer Émile Zola. Subtitled Histoire naturelle et sociale d'une famille sous le Second Empire (Natural and social history of a family under the Second Empire), it follows the lives of the members of the two eponymous branches of a fictional family living during the Second French Empire (1852–1870) and is one of the most prominent works of the French naturalism literary movement.

== Influences ==
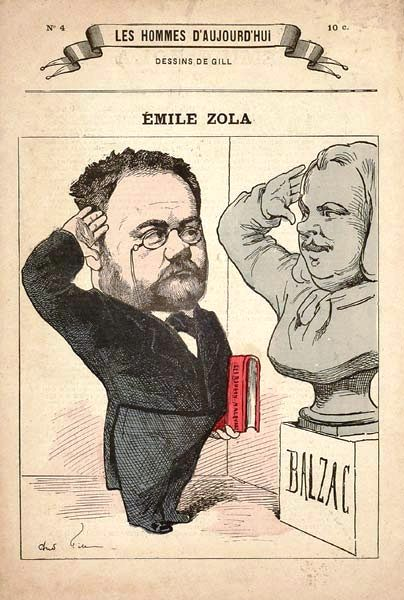
Zola, with the book of the Rougon-Macquart under his arm, salutes the statue of Balzac.

Early in his life, Zola discovered the work of Honoré de Balzac and his famous cycle La Comédie humaine. This had a profound impact on Zola, who decided to write his own, unique cycle. However, in 1869, he explained in Différences entre Balzac et moi, why he would not make the same kind of book as Balzac:

In one word, his work wants to be the mirror of the contemporary society. My work, mine, will be something else entirely. The scope will be narrower. I don't want to describe the contemporary society, but a single family, showing how the race is modified by the environment. (...) My big task is to be strictly naturalist, strictly physiologist.

As a naturalist writer, Zola was highly interested in science and especially the problem of heredity and evolution. He notably read and mentioned the work of the doctor Prosper Lucas, Claude Bernard, and Charles Darwin as references for his own work. This led him to think that people are heavily influenced by heredity and their environment. He intended to prove this by showing how these two factors could influence the members of a family. In 1871, in the preface of La Fortune des Rougon, he explained his intent:

The great characteristic of the Rougon-Macquarts, the group or family which I propose to study, is their ravenous appetite, the great outburst of our age which rushes upon enjoyment. Physiologically the Rougon-Macquarts represent the slow succession of accidents pertaining to the nerves or the blood, which befall a race after the first organic lesion, and, according to environment, determine in each individual member of the race those feelings, desires and passions—briefly, all the natural and instinctive manifestations peculiar to humanity—whose outcome assumes the conventional name of virtue or vice.

== Preparations ==
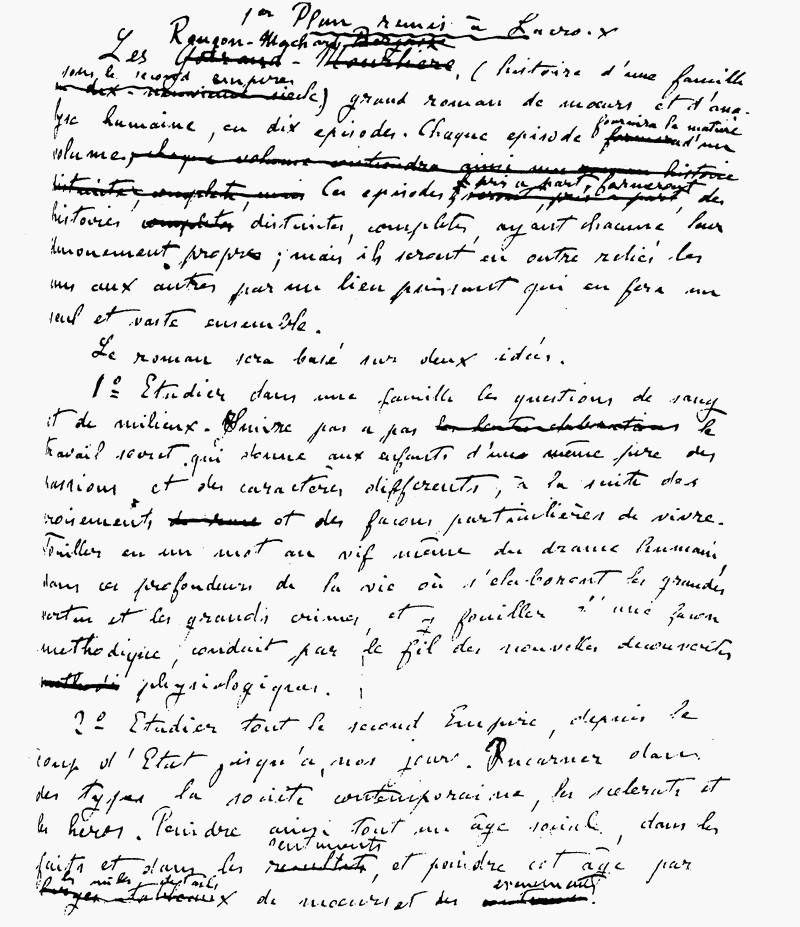
Letter by Zola to his publisher

In a letter to his publisher, Zola stated his goals for the Rougon-Macquart: "1° To study in a family the questions of blood and environments. [...] 2° To study the whole Second Empire, from the coup d'état to nowadays."

=== Genealogy and heredity ===
Since his first goal was to show how heredity can affect the lives of descendants, Zola started working on the Rougon-Macquart by drawing the family tree for the Rougon-Macquart. Though it was to be modified many times over the years, with some members appearing or disappearing, the original tree shows how Zola planned the whole cycle before writing the first book.

The tree provides the name and date of birth of each member, along with certain properties of his heredity and his life:

- The prepotency : The prepotency is a term used by the doctor Lucas. It is part of a biological theory that tries to determine how heredity transmits traits through generations. Zola apply this theory to the mental state of his protagonists and uses terms from the work of the doctor Lucas: Election du père (Prepotency of the father, meaning the father is the main influence on the child), Election de la mère (Prepotency of the mother), Mélange soudure (Fusion of the 2 parents) or Innéité (No influence from either parent).
- Physical likeness: Whether the member looks like his mother or his father.
- Biographical information: his job and important facts of his life. Additionally, for members still living at the end of Le Docteur Pascal, their place of living at the end of the cycle may be included. Otherwise, the date of death is included.
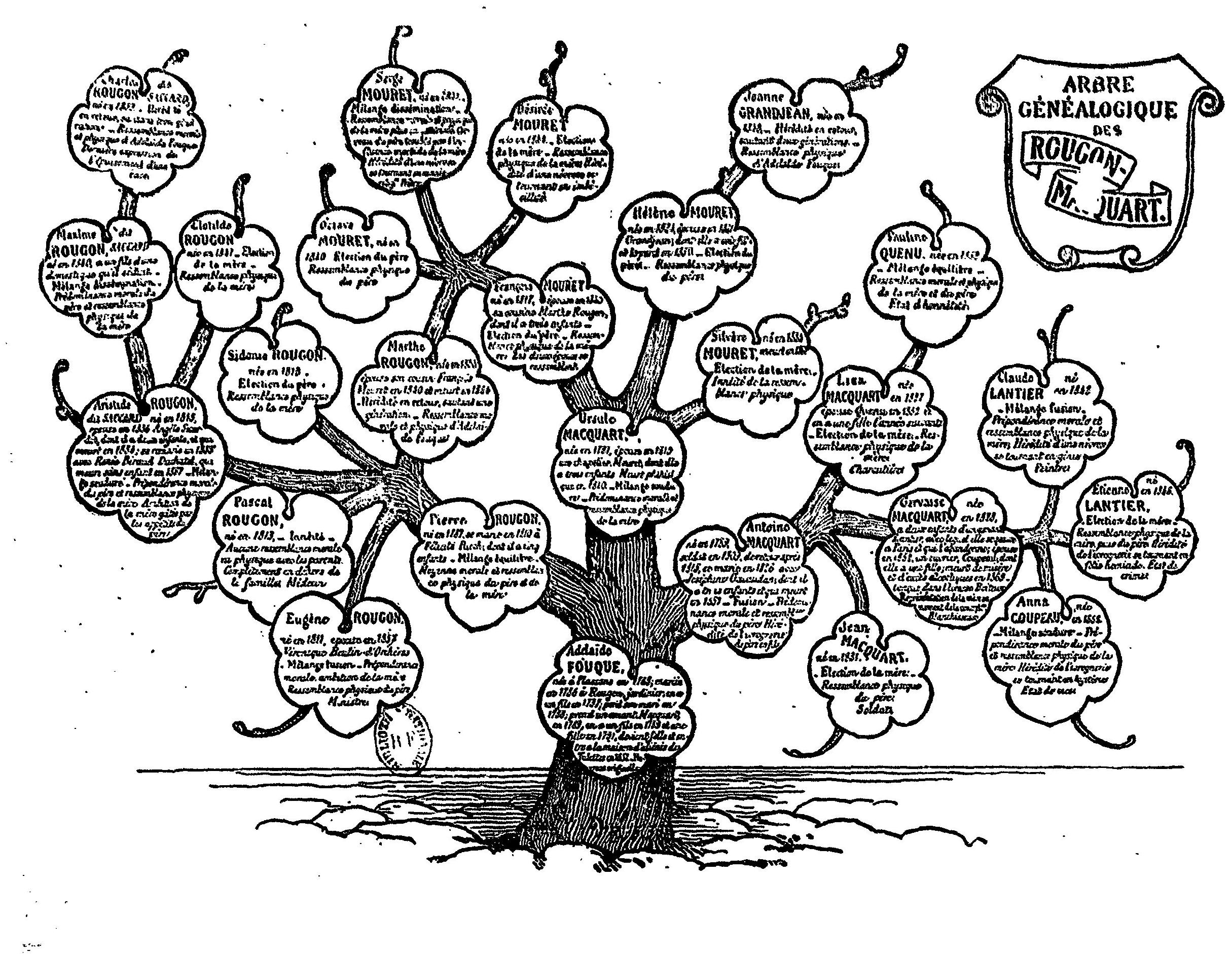
The 1878 tree, published in a note included in Une Page d'amour

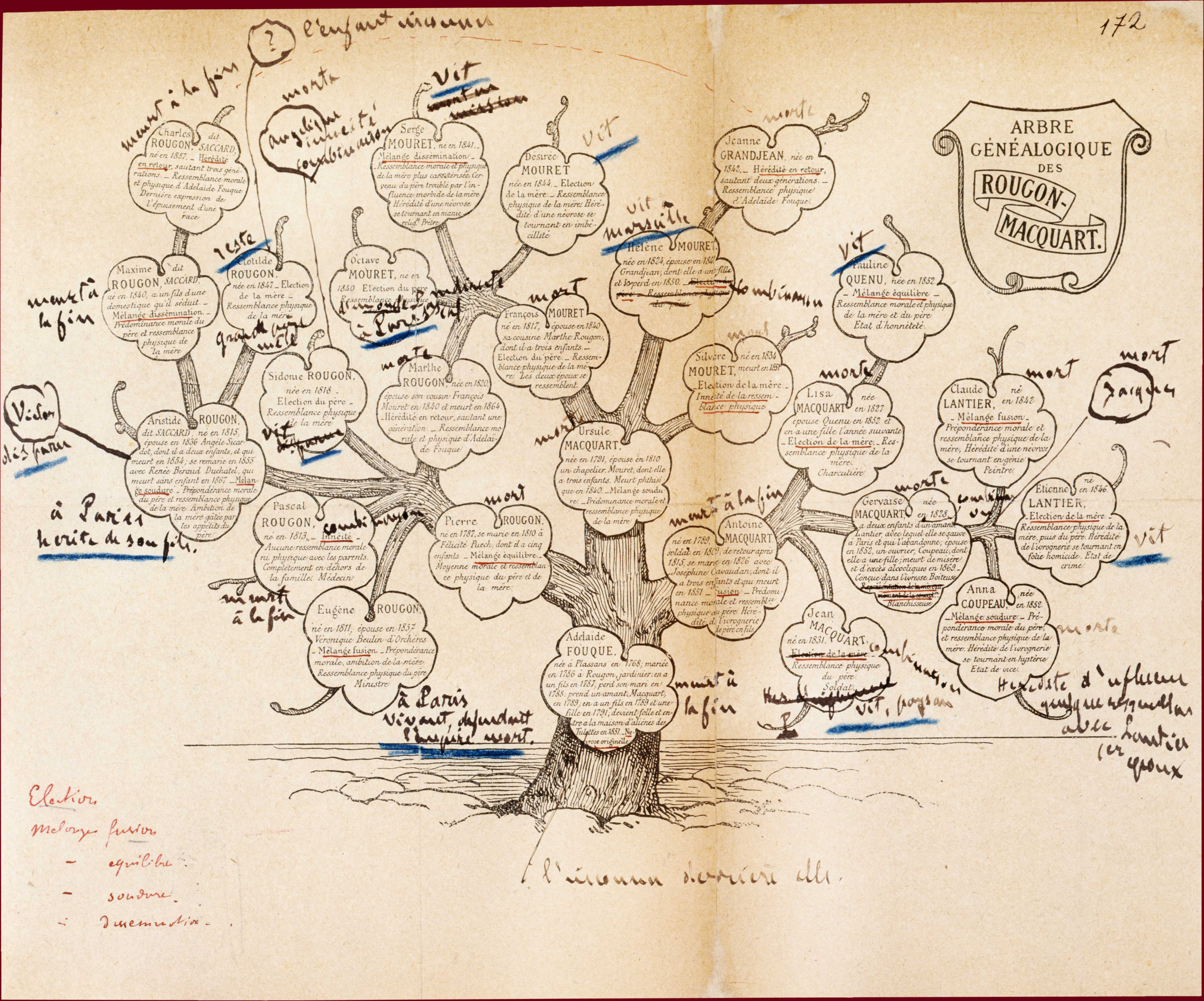
The 1892 and final tree, annotated by Zola and which published in 1893 with his final novel Le Docteur Pascal

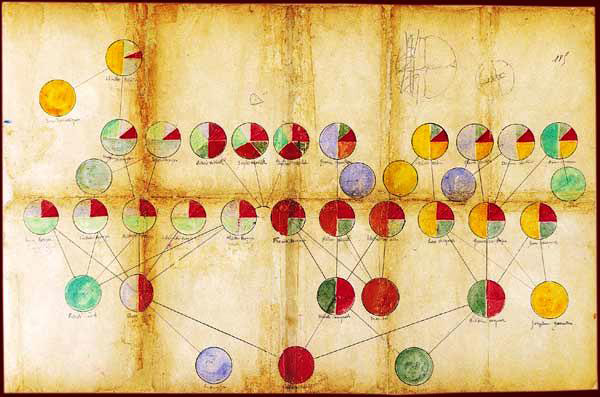
A late "mathematical" tree drawn by Georges Pouchet. This was included in Zola's preparatory dossier for the final novel Le Docteur Pascal published in 1893. Each ancestor has a color, and each child is influenced by one or more of their ancestors.

Note: the gallery does not include the tree made for La Bete humaine which included for the first time Jacques, the main protagonist of the book

For example, the entry for Jean Macquart on the 1878 tree read: Jean Macquart, né en 1831 – Election de la mère – Ressemblance physique du père. Soldat (Jean Macquart, born in 1831 – Prepotency of the mother – Physical likeness to his father. Soldier)

=== The study of the Second Empire ===
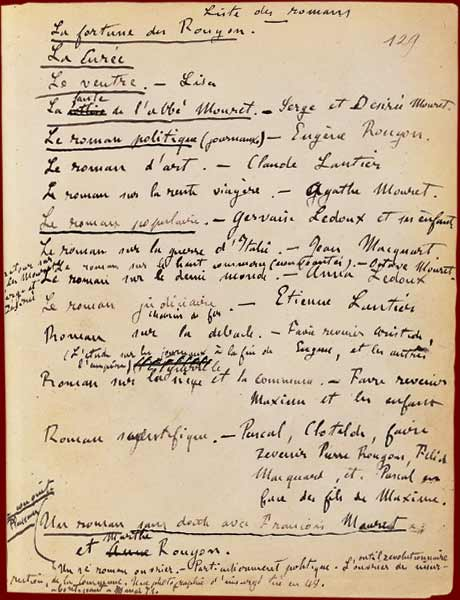
Note by Zola (1872) mentioning 17 ideas of book. Some would never be made, others were to be added later on.

To study the Second Empire, Zola thought of each novel as a novel about a specific aspect of the life in his time. For example, in the list he made in 1872, he intended to make a "political novel", a "novel about the defeat", "a scientific novel", and a "novel about the war in Italy". The first three ideas led to Son Excellence Eugène Rougon, La Débâcle, and Le Docteur Pascal, respectively. However, the last idea would never be made into a book.

Indeed, at the beginning, Zola did not know exactly how many books he would write. In the first letter to his publisher, he mentioned "ten episodes". In 1872, his list included seventeen novels, but some of them would never be made (such as the one on the war in Italy), whereas others were to be added later on. In 1877, in the preface of L'Assommoir, he stated that he was going to write "about twenty novels". In the end, he settled for twenty books.

== Story ==
Almost all of the main protagonists for each novel are introduced in the first book, La Fortune des Rougon. The last novel in the cycle, Le Docteur Pascal, contains a lengthy chapter that ties up loose ends from the other novels. In between, there is no "best sequence" in which to read the novels in the cycle, as they are not in chronological order and indeed are impossible to arrange into such an order. Although some of the novels in the cycle are direct sequels to one another, many of them follow on directly from the last chapters of La Fortune des Rougon, and there is a great deal of chronological overlap between the books; there are numerous recurring characters and several of them make "guest" appearances in novels centered on other members of the family.

=== The Rougon-Macquart ===
The Rougon-Macquart family begins with Adelaïde Fouque. Born in 1768 in the fictional Provençal town Plassans to middle-class parents (members of the French "bourgeoisie"), she has a slight intellectual disability. She marries Rougon, and gives birth to a son, Pierre Rougon. However, she also has a lover, the smuggler Macquart, with whom she has two children: Ursule and Antoine Macquart. This means that the family is split in three branches:

- The first, legitimate, one is the Rougons branch. They are the most successful of the children. Most of them live in the upper classes (such as Eugene Rougon who becomes a minister) or/and have a good education (such as Pascal, the doctor who is the main protagonist of Le Docteur Pascal).
- The second branch is the low-born Macquarts. They are urban working-class (L'Assommoir), farmers (La Terre), or soldiers (La Débâcle).
- The third branch is the Mourets (the name of Ursule Macquart's husband). They are a mix of the other two. They are middle-class people (bourgeois) and tend to live more balanced lives than the others.

Because Zola believed that everyone is driven by their heredity, Adelaide's children show signs of their mother's original deficiency. For the Rougon, this manifests as a drive for power, money, and excess in life. For the Macquarts, who live in a difficult environment, it is manifested by alcoholism (L'Assommoir), prostitution (Nana), and homicide (La Bête humaine). Even the Mourets are marked to a certain degree; in La Faute de l'Abbé Mouret, the priest Serge Mouret has to fight his desire for a young woman.

Rougon-Macquart family tree

Eugène Rougon 1811 -	Justine Mégot
Charles Saccard 1857-1873
Véronique Beulin d'Orchères	Maxime Saccard 1840-1873
Dr Pascal Rougon 1813-1873	Louise de Mareuil
Angèle Sicardot	A son 1874-
Rougon	Aristide Saccard 1815-	Clotilde Saccard 1847-
Pierre Rougon 1787-1870
Renée Béraud du Châtel	Victor Saccard 1853-
Félicité Puech
Rosalie Chavaille
Sidonie Rougon 1818-	Angélique Marie 1851-1869
Caroline Hédouin	A son
Octave Mouret 1840-	A daughter
Marthe Rougon 1819-1864
Adélaïde Fouque 1768-1873	Denise Baudu
François Mouret 1817-1864
Abbé Serge Mouret 1841-
Mouret	Désirée Mouret 1844-
Grandjean
Ursule Macquart 1791-1839	Jeanne Grandjean 1842-1855
Hélène Mouret 1824-
Silvère Mouret 1834-1851
Quenu
Pauline Quenu 1852-
Macquart	Lisa Macquart 1824-1863
Christine Hallegrain
Jacques-Louis Lantier 1864-1876
Auguste Lantier	Claude Lantier 1842-1876
Jacques Lantier 1844-1870
Antoine Macquart 1789-1873	Gervaise Macquart 1829-1869
Étienne Lantier 1846-	A daughter
Joséphine Gavaudan
Anna Coupeau 1852-1870	Louis Coupeau 1867-1870
Coupeau
Françoise Mouche
Jean Macquart 1831-
Three children
Mélanie Vial

=== View of France under Napoleon III ===
As a naturalist, Zola also gave detailed descriptions of urban and rural settings, and different types of businesses. Le Ventre de Paris, for example, has a detailed description of the central market in Paris at the time.

As a political reflection of life under Napoleon III, the novel La Conquête de Plassans looks at how an ambitious priest infiltrates a small Provence town one family at a time, starting with the Rougons. La Débâcle takes place during the 1870 Franco-Prussian War and depicts Napoleon III's downfall. Son Excellence also looks at political life, and Pot-Bouille and Au Bonheur des Dames look at middle class life in Paris.

Note that Zola wrote the novels after the fall of Napoleon III.

== List of novels ==
In an "Introduction" of his last novel, Le Docteur Pascal, Zola gave a recommended reading order, although it is not required, as each novel stands on its own.

Publication order

1. La Fortune des Rougon (1871)
2. La Curée (1872)
3. Le Ventre de Paris (1873)
4. La Conquête de Plassans (1874)
5. La Faute de l'Abbé Mouret (1875)
6. Son Excellence Eugène Rougon (1876)
7. L'Assommoir (1877)
8. Une page d'amour (1878)
9. Nana (1880)
10. Pot-Bouille (1882)
11. Au Bonheur des Dames (1883)
12. La joie de vivre (1884)
13. Germinal (1885)
14. L'Œuvre (1886)
15. La Terre (1887)
16. Le Rêve (1888)
17. La Bête humaine (1890)
18. L'Argent (1891)
19. La Débâcle (1892)
20. Le Docteur Pascal (1893)

A recommended reading order

1. La Fortune des Rougon (The Fortune of the Rougons) (1871)
2. Son Excellence Eugène Rougon (His Excellency Eugène Rougon) (1876)
3. La Curée (The Kill) (1872)
4. L'Argent (Money) (1891)
5. Le Rêve (The Dream) (1888)
6. La Conquête de Plassans (The Conquest of Plassans) (1874)
7. Pot-Bouille (Pot Luck) (1882)
8. Au Bonheur des Dames (The Ladies Paradise/The Ladies' Delight) (1883)
9. La Faute de l'Abbé Mouret (The Sin of Father Mouret) (1875)
10. Une page d'amour (A Love Story) (1878)
11. Le Ventre de Paris (The Belly of Paris) (1873)
12. La joie de vivre (The Bright Side of Life) (1884)
13. L'Assommoir (The Drinking Den) (1877)
14. L'Œuvre (The Masterpiece) (1886)
15. La Bête humaine (The Beast Within) (1890)
16. Germinal (1885)
17. Nana (1880)
18. La Terre (The Earth) (1887)
19. La Débâcle (The Debacle) (1892)
20. Le Docteur Pascal (Doctor Pascal) (1893)

== English translations ==
All 20 novels have been translated into English under various titles and editions at least three times. For many years, the novels were best known in bowdlerized editions of the late 19th and early 20th century, especially those published by Vizetelly & Co. Although the more well-known novels in the series received 20th century translations, and Elek Books published 11 new translations during the 1950s, many of the volumes remained largely out-of-print in the English language for decades after Zola's death. For instance, The Fortune of the Rougons was translated in 1898, and then not again until 2012. The Kill was translated in 1895, and then not again until 2004.

After about 1970, unexpurgated modern translations of the more famous novels in the series, such as L'Assommoir and Germinal, were released by publishers like Penguin and Modern Library. Between 1993 (Germinal) and 2020 (Le Docteur Pascal), Oxford World's Classics published a complete run of all 20 novels in annotated modern unexpurgated scholarly translations.

This list comprises first-edition English translations. Later reprints in different years or under different titles or publishers generally not included. Source for early translation information:

1. La Fortune des Rougon

- The Girl in Scarlet; or, The Loves of Silvère and Miette (1882, tr. John Stirling, T. B. Peterson & Brothers)
- The Fortune of the Rougons (1886, tr. unknown for H. Vizetelly, Vizetelly & Co.)
- The Fortune of the Rougons (1898, tr. unknown edited by E. A. Vizetelly, Chatto & Windus)
- The Fortune of the Rougons (2012, tr. Brian Nelson, Oxford University Press)

2. La Curée

- The Rush for the Spoil (1886, tr. unknown for H. Vizetelly, Vizetelly & Co.)
- The Kill (1895, tr. A. Teixeira de Mattos, Lutetian Society)
- The Kill (2004, tr. Brian Nelson, Oxford University Press)
- The Kill (2004, tr. Arthur Goldhammer, Modern Library)

3. Le Ventre de Paris

- La Belle Lisa or The Paris Market Girls (1882, tr. Mary Neal Sherwood, T. B. Peterson Bros.)
- The Fat and the Thin (1888, tr. unknown for H. Vizetelly, Vizetelly & Co.)
- The Fat and the Thin (1896, tr. E. A. Vizetelly, Chatto & Windus)
- Savage Paris (1955, tr. David Hughes & Marie-Jacqueline Mason, Elek Books)
- The Belly of Paris (2007, tr. Brian Nelson, Oxford University Press)
- The Belly of Paris (2009, tr. Mark Kurlansky, Modern Library)

4. La Conquête de Plassans

- The Conquest of Plassans (1887, tr. unknown for H. Vizetelly, Vizetelly & Co.)
- A Priest in the House (1957, tr. Brian Rhys, Elek Books)
- The Conquest of Plassans (2014, tr. Helen Constantine, Oxford University Press)

5. La Faute de l'Abbé Mouret

- Abbé Mouret's Transgression (1886, tr. unknown for H. Vizetelly, Vizetelly & Co.)
- Abbé Mouret's Transgression (1900, tr. unknown edited by E. A. Vizetelly, Chatto & Windus)
- The Sin of the Abbé Mouret (1904, tr. M. Smyth, McLaren & Co.)
- The Abbé Mouret's Sin (1957, tr. Alec Brown, Elek Books, republished as The Sinful Priest in 1960)
- The Sin of Father Mouret (1969, tr. Sandy Petrey, Prentice-Hall)
- The Sin of Abbé Mouret (2017, tr. Valerie Minogue, Oxford University Press)

6. Son Excellence Eugène Rougon

- Clorinda or The Rise and Reign of His Excellency Eugène Rougon (1880, tr. Mary Neal Sherwood, T.B. Peterson & Bros.)
- His Excellency Eugène Rougon (1886, tr. unknown for H. Vizetelly, Vizetelly & Co.)
- His Excellency (1958, tr. Alec Brown, Elek Books)
- His Excellency Eugène Rougon (2018, tr. Brian Nelson, Oxford University Press)

7. L'Assommoir

- L'assommoir (1879, tr. Mary Neal Sherwood, T.B. Peterson & Bros.)
- Gervaise (1879, tr. E. Binsse, G. W. Carleton & Co.)
- The ‘Assommoir’ (1884, tr. unknown for H. Vizetelly, Vizetelly & Co.)
- L'Assommoir (1895, tr. Arthur Symons, Lutetian Society)
- The Dram Shop (1897, tr. unknown edited by E. A. Vizetelly, Chatto & Windus)
- Drink (1903, tr. S.J.A. Fitzgerald, Greening & Co.)
- The Dram Shop (1951, tr. Gerard Hopkins, Hamish Hamilton)
- The Gin Palace (1952, tr. Buckner B. Trawick, Avon Publications)
- L'Assommoir (1962, tr. Atwood H. Townsend, New American Library)
- L'Assommoir (1970, tr. Leonard Tancock, Penguin Books)
- L'Assommoir (1995, tr. Margaret Mauldon, Oxford University Press)
- The Drinking Den (2000, tr. Robin Buss, Penguin Books)
- The Assommoir (2021, tr. Brian Nelson, Oxford University Press)

8. Une Page d'amour

- Hélène: A Love Episode (1878, tr. Mary Neal Sherwood, T.B. Peterson & Bros.)
- A Love Episode (1886, tr. unknown for H. Vizetelly, Vizetelly & Co.)
- A Love Episode (1895, tr. E. A. Vizetelly, Hutchinson & Co.)
- A Page of Love (1897, tr. T. F. Rogerson, Geo Barrie & Son)
- A Love Episode (1905, tr. C. C. Starkweather, Société des Beaux-arts)
- A Love Affair (1957, tr. Jean Stewart, Elek Books)
- A Love Story (2017, tr. Helen Constantine, Oxford University Press)

9. Nana

- Nana (1884, tr. unknown for H. Vizetelly, Vizetelly & Co.)
- Nana (1895, tr. Victor Plarr, Lutetian Society)
- Nana (1926, tr. Joseph Keating, Cecil Palmer)
- Nana (1953, tr. Charles Duff, William Heinemann)
- Nana (1964, tr. Lowell Blair, Bantam Books)
- Nana (1972, tr. George Holden, Penguin Books)
- Nana (1992, tr. Douglas Parmee, Oxford University Press)
- Nana (2020, tr. Helen Constantine, introduction and annotation by Brian Nelson, Oxford University Press)

10. Pot-Bouille

- Piping Hot! (1885, tr. unknown for H. Vizetelly, Vizetelly & Co.)
- Pot-Bouille (1895, tr. Percy Pinkerton, Lutetian Society)

- Restless House (other versions of Pinkerton's translation)

- Pot Luck (1999, tr. Brian Nelson, Oxford University Press)

11. Au Bonheur des Dames

- Shop Girls of Paris (1883, tr. Mary Neal Sherwood, T.B. Peterson & Bros.)
- The Ladies' Paradise (1883, tr. Frank Belmont, Tinsley Bros.)
- Ladies' Delight (1957, tr. April Fitzlyon, John Calder)
- The Ladies Paradise (1995, tr. Brian Nelson, Oxford University Press)
- Au Bonheur des Dames (The Ladies' Delight) (2001, tr. Robin Buss, Penguin Books)

12. La joie de vivre

- How Jolly Life Is! (1886, tr. unknown for H. Vizetelly, Vizetelly & Co.)
- The Joy of Life (1901, tr. unknown edited by E. A. Vizetelly, Chatto & Windus)
- Zest for Life (1955, tr. Jean Stewart, Elek Books)
- The Bright Side of Life (2018, tr. Andrew Rothwell, Oxford University Press)

13. Germinal

- Germinal (1885, tr. Carlynne, Belford, Clarke & Co.)
- Germinal (1886, tr. Albert Vandam, Vizetelly & Co.)
- Germinal (1894, tr. Havelock Ellis and Edith Ellis, Lutetian Society)
- Germinal (1954, tr. L. W. Tancock, Penguin Books)
- Germinal (1962, tr. Willard R. Trask, Bantam Books)
- Germinal (1970, tr. Stanley Hochman and Eleanor Hochman, New American Library)
- Germinal (1993, tr. Peter Collier, Oxford University Press)
- Germinal (1996, tr. David Baguley's revision of Havelock Ellis and Edith Ellis translation, Everyman Paperbacks)
- Germinal (2004, tr. Roger Pearson, Penguin Books)
- Germinal (2011, tr. Raymond N. MacKenzie, Hackett Publishing)

14. L'Œuvre

- The Masterpiece (1886, tr. G. D. Cox, T. B. Peterson & Bros.)
- His Masterpiece (1886, tr. Albert Vandam, Vizetelly & Co.)
- His Masterpiece (1902, tr. Albert Vandam edited by E. A. Vizetelly, Chatto & Windus)
- The Masterpiece (1946, tr. Katherine Woods, Howell Soskin)
- The Masterpiece (1950, tr. Thomas Walton, Elek Books)
- The Masterpiece (1993, tr. Roger Pearson's revision of Thomas Walton's translation, Oxford University Press)

15. La Terre

- The Soil (c. 1888, tr. G. D. Cox, T. B. Peterson & Bros.)
- The Soil (1888, tr. unknown for E. A. Vizetelly, Vizetelly & Co.)
- La Terre (1895, tr. Ernest Dowson, Lutetian Society)
- Earth (1954, tr. Ann Lindsay, Elek Books)
- Earth (1962, tr. Margaret Crosland, New English Library)
- The Earth (1980, tr. Douglas Parmee, Penguin Books)
- Earth (2016, tr. Brian Nelson and Julie Rose, Oxford University Press)

16. Le Rêve

- The Dream (1893, tr. Eliza E. Chase, Chatto & Windus)
- The Dream (2005, tr. Michael Glencross, Peter Owen)
- The Dream (2005, tr. Andrew Brown, Hesperus Press)
- The Dream (2018, Paul Gibbard, Oxford University Press)
- The Dream (2024, Liam Ferousse) ISBN 979-8304395991

17. La Bête humaine

- The Human Beast (c. 1891, tr. G. D. Cox, T. B. Peterson)
- The Monomaniac (1901, tr. Edward Vizetelly, Hutchinson & Co.)
- The Human Beast (1937, tr. Louis Colman, Julien Press)
- The Human Beast (1954, tr. Frances Frenaye, Avon Publications)
- The Beast in Man (1958, tr. Alec Brown, Elek Books)
- La Bete Humaine (1977, tr. Leonard Tancock, Penguin Books)
- La Bete Humaine (1999, tr. Roger Pearson, Oxford University Press)
- The Beast Within (2008, tr. Roger Whitehouse, Penguin Books)

18. L'Argent

- Money (1891, tr. Benjamin R. Tucker, Benjamin R. Tucker)
- Money (1894, tr. E. A. Vizetelly, Chatto & Windus)
- Money (2014, tr. Valerie Minogue, Oxford University Press)
- Money (2016, tr. André Naffis-Sahely, Alma Books)

19. La Débâcle

- The Downfall (1892, tr. E. A. Vizetelly, Chatto & Windus)
- The Downfall or The Smash-up (1898, tr. E. P. Robins, The Cassell Co.)
- The Downfall (1902, tr. W. M. Sloane, P. F. Collier & Son)
- The Debacle (1968, tr. John Hands, Elek Books)
- The Debacle (1972, tr. Leonard Tancock, Penguin Books)
- La Débâcle (2000, tr. Elinor Dorday, Oxford University Press)

20. Le Docteur Pascal

- Doctor Pascal (1893, tr. E. A. Vizetelly, Chatto & Windus)
- Doctor Pascal (1901, tr. Mary J. Serrano, MacMillan Co.)
- Doctor Pascal (1957, tr. Vladimir Kean, Elek Books)
- Doctor Pascal (2020, tr. Julie Rose with notes by Brian Nelson, Oxford University Press)

== Adaptations ==
The BBC adapted the novels into a 27-episode (20 hour) radio drama series called Blood, Sex and Money by Emile Zola. The "radical re-imagining" was broadcast in three seasons on BBC Radio 4 between November 2015 and October 2016.
