= La joie de vivre =

1884 novel by Émile Zola

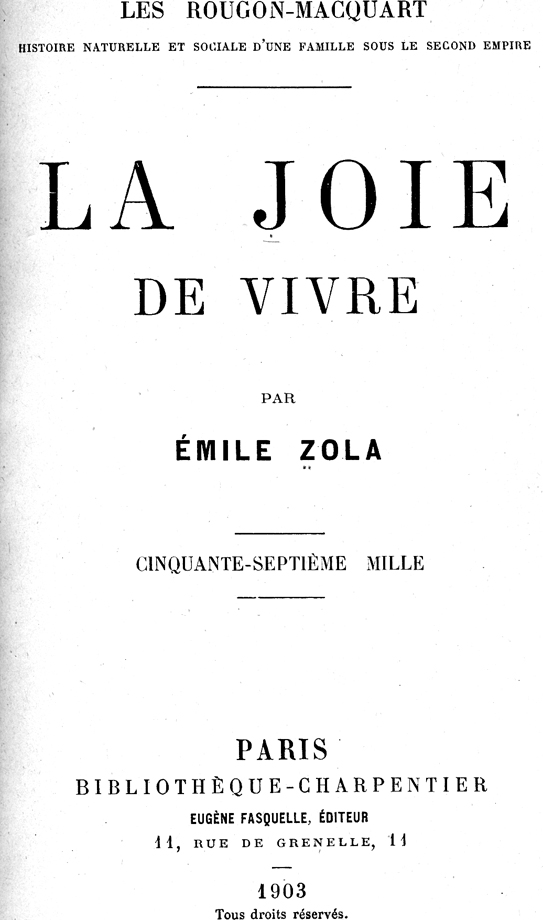
- 1903 edition
- Author: Émile Zola
- Translator: Andrew Rothwell
- Language: French
- Series: Les Rougon-Macquart
- Genre: Novel
- Publisher: Charpentier (book form)
- Publication date: 1883-1884 (serial) & 1884 (book form)
- Publication place: France
- English publication date: 2018
- Media type: Print (serial, hardback & paperback)
- Pages: 368 (paperback)
- Preceded by: The Belly of Paris
- Followed by: The Drinking Den

La joie de vivre (English: The Joy of Living) is the twelfth novel in the Rougon-Macquart series by Émile Zola. It was serialized in the periodical Gil Blas in 1883 before being published in book form by Charpentier in February 1884.

The main character is Pauline Quenu (b. 1852), the daughter of Parisian charcutiers Lisa Macquart and M. Quenu, who are central characters in Le ventre de Paris (published 1873). Pauline plays a small part in that novel.

== Plot summary ==
The novel opens in 1863 and covers about 10 years. Ten-year-old Pauline's parents have died, and she comes to live with the Chanteaus, relatives on her father's side, in the seaside village of Bonneville, some 10 kilometers from Arromanches-les-Bains in Normandy. Zola contrasts Pauline's optimism and open-heartedness with the illness, resentment, and depression prevalent in the Chanteau household. In particular, the 19-year-old son Lazare, a student of the writings of Schopenhauer, is convinced of life's futility and infused with pessimism and nihilism, which he attempts to express in an unfinished Symphony of Sorrow.

Over the course of several years, a series of financial setbacks causes Mme. Chanteau to "borrow" from Pauline's inheritance. Lazare's investment in a factory to extract minerals from seaweed and his project to build a series of jetties and breakwaters to protect Bonneville from the pounding waves — and the subsequent failure of both these enterprises — reduce Pauline's fortune even further. Through it all, Pauline retains her optimistic outlook and love for Lazare and his parents. Eventually, that love extends to the entire town as Pauline provides money, food, and support to Bonneville's poor, despite their evident greed and degeneracy.

Gradually, Mme. Chanteau grows to resent Pauline, blaming her for the family's bad luck and accusing her of being miserly, ungrateful, and selfish. Even on her deathbed, Mme. Chanteau is unable to get past her resentment, and accuses Pauline of poisoning her when she attempts to nurse her. Though Lazare and Pauline are tacitly engaged, Pauline releases him so that he may marry Louise Thibaudier, a rich banker's daughter who spends her vacations with the Chanteaus. Their marriage is an unhappy one, as his obsessive-compulsive behaviors escalate and he infects her with his fear of death. His inability to maintain gainful employment and his palpable apathy add to their unhappiness.

Louise gives birth to a stillborn baby boy, but Pauline saves his life by breathing air into his lungs. The novel ends 18 months later. The baby, Paul, is healthy and growing, though Louise and Lazare maintain a tense relationship. Bonneville is all but destroyed by the waves. Despite her mistreatment by the family and the loss of nearly all of her money, Pauline is at peace with her life and choices, remaining optimistic. The suicide of the family servant brings the novel to a close, with M. Chanteau, wracked with gout and in constant agony, railing against suicide and praising the joys inherent in the ongoing fight for life in the face of sorrow and unhappiness.

== Relation to the other Rougon-Macquart novels ==
La joie de vivre is one of the least typical of the Rougon-Macquart novels. It is not set in or near Paris, nor is it set in Zola's fictional Plassans, the town where the family originates. Pauline's somewhat tenuous and unexplored connection to her Rougon and Macquart relatives is the only link to the rest of the series.

Zola's plan for these novels was to show how heredity and environment worked on members of one family over the course of the Second French Empire. All of the descendants of Adelaïde Fouque (Tante Dide), Pauline's great-grandmother, demonstrate what today would be called obsessive-compulsive behaviors. Pauline demonstrates these characteristics to a lesser degree than anyone in the family who is a focus of his or her own book.

Indeed, the Chanteau family, especially the son Lazare, more clearly demonstrate these behaviors. The Chanteaus are not, however, in the direct Rougon-Macquart line.

Another characteristic of the family is a streak of jealousy and possessiveness. Pauline, while demonstrating these traits, consciously fights against them. The result of this struggle is her positive outlook, altruism, and sense of joie de vivre.

Mentioned in the course of the novel are Pauline's cousins Aristide Saccard (La curée and L'argent), Octave Mouret (Pot-bouille and Au bonheur des dames) and Claude Lantier (L'œuvre), and M. Rambaud (Une page d'amour), the husband of her cousin Hélène Mouret.

In Le docteur Pascal (set in 1872–1873), Zola tells us that Pauline still lives in Bonneville. Lazare, now a widower, has gone to America, leaving Paul in her care.

== Cultural influence ==
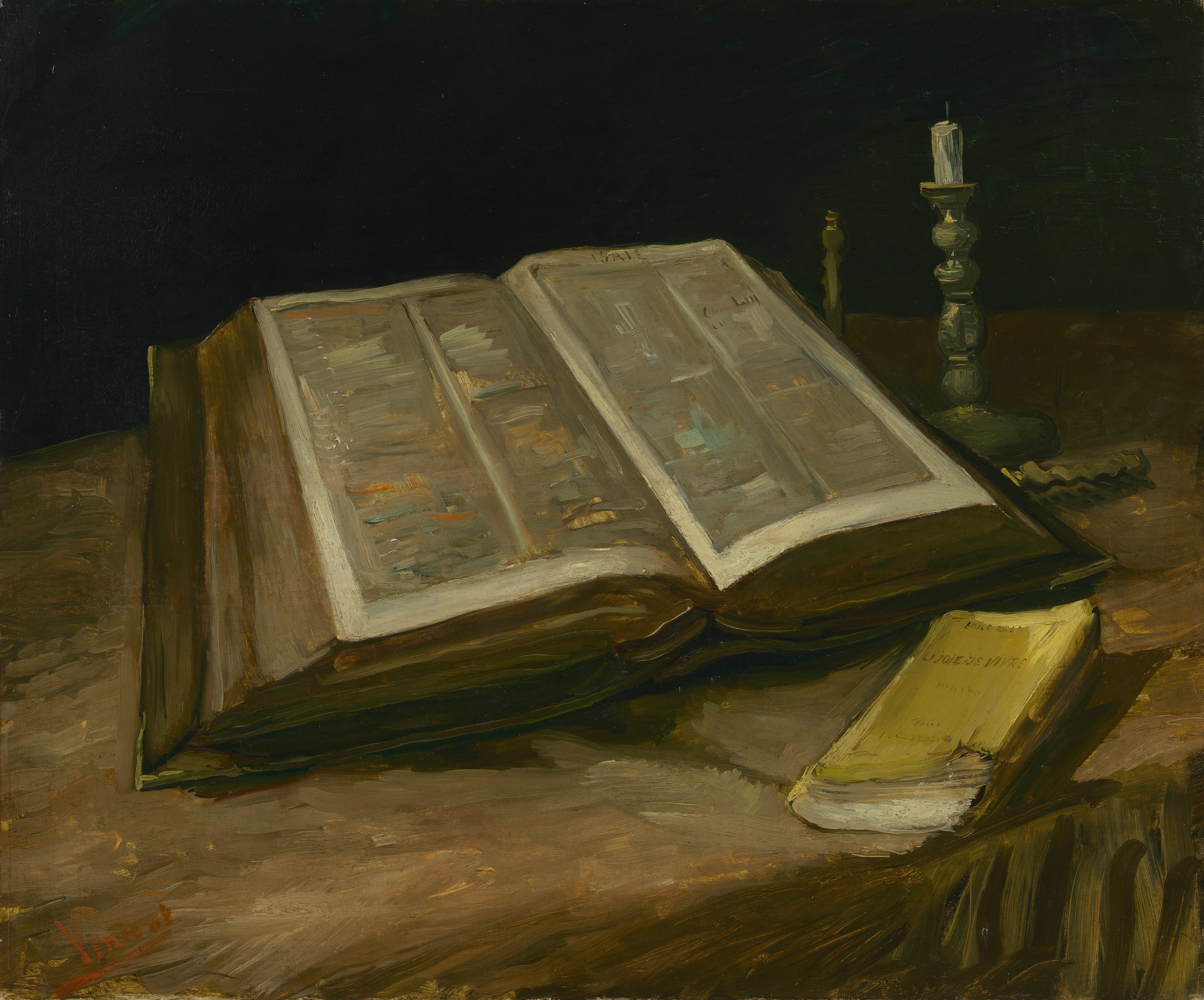
Still Life with Bible, Vincent van Gogh (1885)

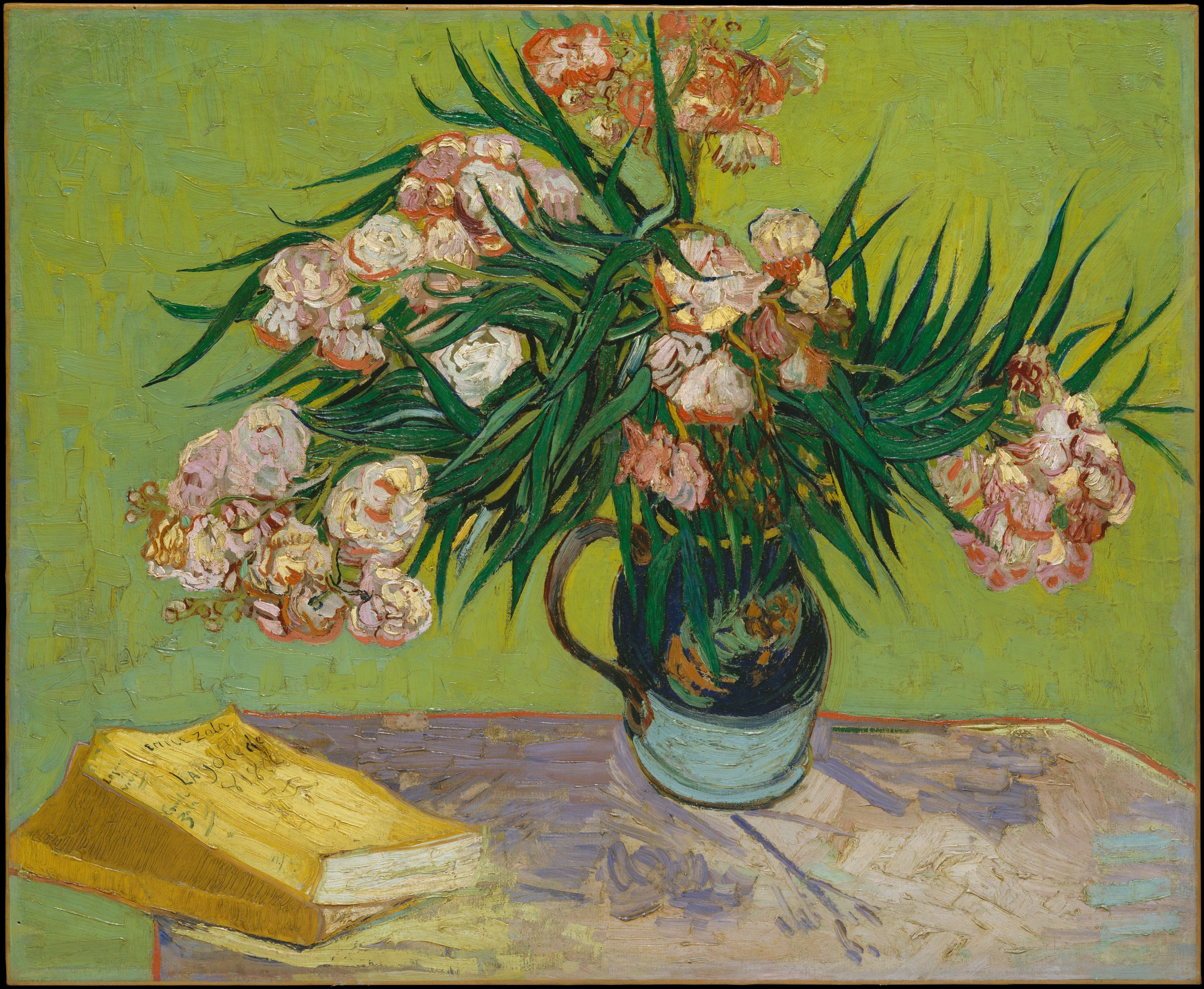
Vase with Oleanders and Books, van Gogh (1888)

La joie de vivre was an important book to 19th century painter Vincent van Gogh. It is featured in two of his paintings: Still Life with Bible and Vase with Oleanders and Books.

== Adaptation ==
The book was adapted as a 2012 French TV film, also called La joie de vivre, directed by Jean-Pierre Améris and starring Anaïs Demoustier as Pauline. In 2016, Swindle, a "radical re-imagining" largely inspired by the book was broadcast on BBC Radio 4 as part of its radio drama series Blood, Sex and Money by Emile Zola.

== English Translations ==
=== Expurgated ===
1. How Jolly Life Is! (1886, tr. unknown for H. Vizetelly, Vizetelly & Co.)
2. The Joy of Life (1901, tr. unknown edited by E. A. Vizetelly, Chatto & Windus)

=== Unexpurgated ===
1. Zest for Life (1955, tr. Jean Stewart, Elek Books)
2. The Bright Side of Life (2018, tr. Andrew Rothwell, Oxford University Press)
