= Pot-Bouille =

1882 novel by Émile Zola

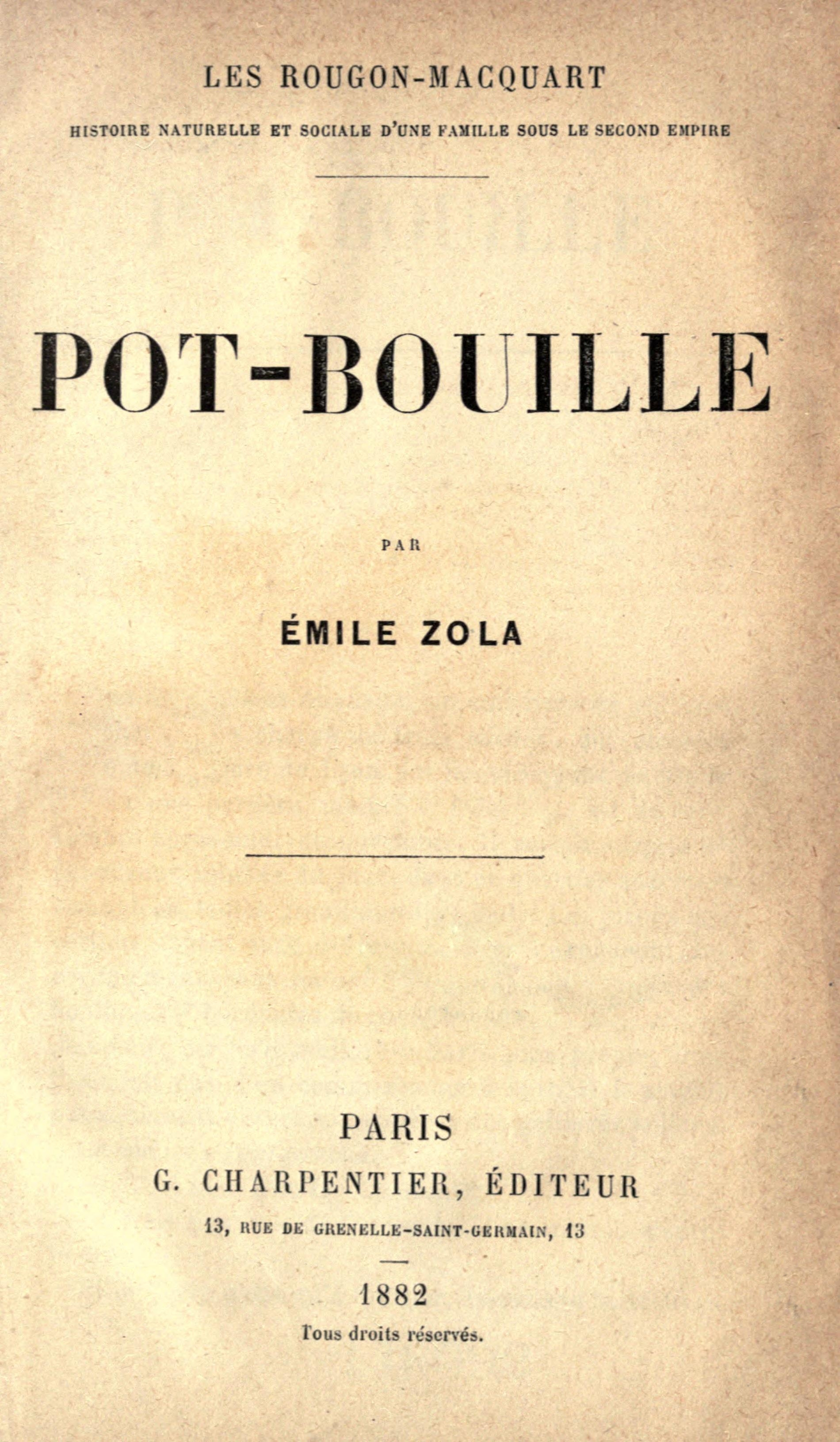
- First edition title page.
- Author: Émile Zola
- Translator: Brian Nelson
- Language: French
- Series: Les Rougon-Macquart
- Genre: Novel
- Publisher: Charpentier (book form)
- Publication date: 1882 (serial); 1883 (book form)
- Publication place: France
- English publication date: 1999
- Media type: Print (serial, hardback and paperback)
- Pages: 381 (paperback)
- Preceded by: The Conquest of Plassans
- Followed by: The Ladies' Delight/Paradise

Pot-Bouille is the tenth novel in the Rougon-Macquart series by Émile Zola. It was serialized between January and April 1882 in the periodical Le Gaulois before being published in book form by Charpentier in 1883.

The novel is an indictment of the mores of the bourgeoisie of the Second French Empire. It is set in a Parisian apartment building, a relatively new housing arrangement at the time and its title (roughly translating as stew pot) reflects the disparate and sometimes unpleasant elements lurking behind the building's new façade.

== Explanation of the novel's title ==
Like Zola's earlier novel L'Assommoir (1877), the title is extremely difficult to render in English. The word pot-bouille is a 19th-century French slang term for a large cooking pot or cauldron used for preparing stews and casseroles and also the foods prepared in it. The title is intended to convey a sense of disparate ingredients, the various inhabitants of the building mixed together, to create a potent and heady mix like a strong stew. The impression is to hint at the greed, ambition and depravity which lies behind the pretentious façade of the outwardly well behaved bourgeois apartment block. There is no equivalent word in English to convey this. The closest English term would probably be an expression such as melting pot.

In the 1937 film The Life of Emile Zola, the novel's title is rendered as Piping Hot.

== Plot summary ==
Pot-Bouille recounts the activities of the residents of a block of flats in the Rue de Choiseul over the course of two years (1861–1863). The characters include:

- The Campardons. Madame Campardon has a mysterious medical condition that keeps them from having sex (probably a prolapse since the maids describe her as "blocked"). The husband is having an affair with her distant cousin, who eventually moves in and manages the household while continuing the affair. Despite their best efforts, they cannot conceal this arrangement from their daughter Angèle, who learns all the secrets in the building from the family servant.
- The Duveyriers. Monsieur Duveyrier detests the bourgeois respectability of his wife's household, particularly her piano playing and takes refuge with a bohemian mistress Clarisse, an arrangement that suits his frigid wife perfectly. When Clarisse aspires to domesticity and respectability, Monsieur Duveyrier attempts suicide and later begins an affair with one of the maids.
- The Josserands. Madame Josserand is relentless in her hunt to find husbands for her daughters. Zola compares the business of husband-hunting to prostitution and indeed Madame Josserand trots her daughters out in society to snare any man who will have them, under the cover of respectability and decorum. Madame Josserand instills her contempt for men (including her husband) in her younger daughter Berthe, who is able to compromise Auguste Vabre and force a marriage.
- The Vabres (Théophile and Valérie). The wife, described as neurotic and somewhat hysterical, is involved in multiple, loveless affairs (it is common knowledge that her son is not her husband's). The husband is a possibly impotent hypochondriac living in perpetual suspicion of his wife's behaviour.
- The Pichons. Going through the motions of marriage, they have subjugated all passion in every aspect of their lives, including rearing their daughter, subduing any romance (Madame Pichon has an affinity for the novels of George Sand) beneath cold, hollow propriety.

Condoning the behaviour of these characters are the local priest and doctor, who use their positions to cover up everyone's moral and physical failings. The characters' habits and secrets are also guarded by the concierge, who turns a blind eye to everything going on. The sham respectability of the residents is contrasted with the candour of their servants, who secretly abuse their employers over the open sewer of the building's inner courtyard.

The novel follows the adventures of 22-year-old Octave Mouret, who moves into the building and takes a salesman's job at a nearby shop, The Ladies' Paradise (Au Bonheur des Dames). Though handsome and charming, Octave is rebuffed by Valérie Vabre and his boss's wife Madame Hédouin before beginning a passionless affair with Madame Pichon. His failure with Madame Hédouin prompts him to quit his job, and he goes to work for Auguste Vabre in the silk shop on the building's ground floor. Soon, he begins an affair with Berthe, who by now is Auguste's wife. Octave and Berthe are eventually caught but over the course of several months, the community tacitly agrees to forget the affair and live as if nothing had happened, thereby restoring the veneer of respectability. Octave marries widowed Madame Hédouin and life goes on in the Rue de Choiseul the way it has always done, with outward complacency, morality and quiet.

== Relation to the other Rougon-Macquart novels ==
Zola's plan for the Rougon-Macquart novels was to show how heredity and environment worked on members of one family over the course of the Second Empire.

The family representative in Pot-Bouille is Octave Mouret, first introduced briefly in La fortune des Rougon and playing a larger but background role in La conquête de Plassans. Octave is the son of first cousins Marthe Rougon and François Mouret and great-grandson of Adelaïde Fouque (Tante Dide), the ancestress from whom the family members inherit varying degrees of what today might be called obsessive-compulsive disorder. Zola describes him in Le docteur Pascal (the last novel) as an example of indirect heredity, bearing a physical resemblance to his uncle Eugène Rougon (Son Excellence Eugène Rougon). Like his uncle, Octave is obsessed with power, in the nephew's case over women. He is not ruthless or predatory but uses his charm and good looks to captivate women.

This aspect of his personality is explored further in Au Bonheur des Dames, the next novel, which finds Octave the owner of a giant department store catering to female desire. (Octave also appears briefly or is mentioned in La faute de l'Abbé Mouret, La joie de vivre, L'œuvre and Le docteur Pascal.)

In addition to examining Octave as representative of the Rougon-Macquart line, Zola explores the effects of personal history and environment on the other residents of the apartment building.

== English Translations ==
=== Expurgated ===
Pot-Bouille was translated into English anonymously for Henry Vizetelly in 1885 for the first time and the translation is available in reprints.

- Piping Hot! (1885, tr. unknown for H. Vizetelly, Vizetelly & Co.)

=== Unexpurgated ===
Pot-Bouille was translated into English by Percy Pinkerton in 1895 and the translation is available in reprints. There have been other English translations since (as Piping Hot!, Pot Luck, Restless House and Lesson in Love). It is the least translated novel of the series. The most recent being by Brian Nelson for Oxford World's Classics (1999).

1. Pot-Bouille (1895, tr. Percy Pinkerton, Lutetian Society)/Restless House/Lessons in Love (other versions of Pinkerton's translation)
2. Pot Luck (1999, tr. Brian Nelson, Oxford University Press)

== Adaptations ==
William Busnach adapted Pot-Bouille as a play, produced at the Théâtre de l'Ambigu-Comique in 1883.

It was adapted into a French film, Lovers of Paris (original French title Pot-Bouille) in 1957, directed by Julien Duvivier and starring Gérard Philipe and Anouk Aimée.

It was also adapted as a French TV series, Pot-Bouille, in 1972.
