= Le Rêve (novel) =

1888 novel by Émile Zola

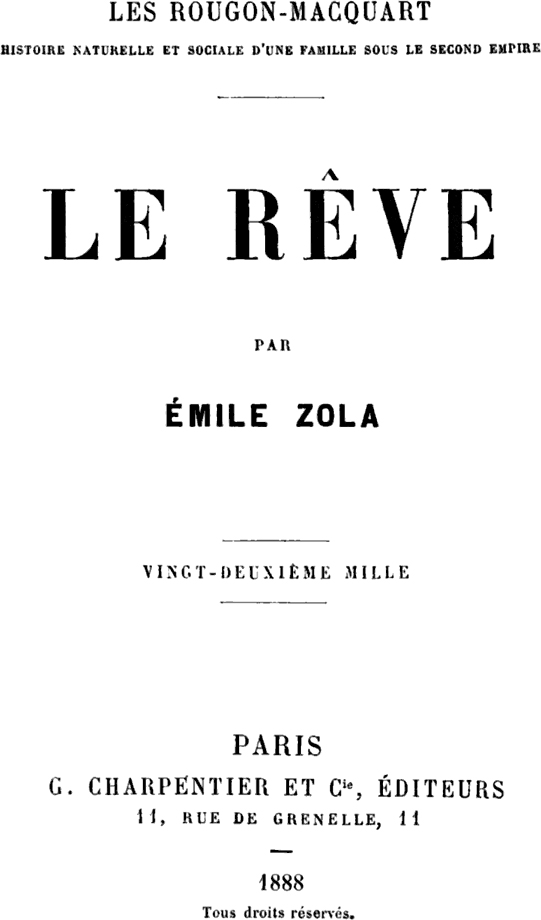
- Author: Émile Zola
- Translator: Paul Gibbard
- Language: French
- Series: Les Rougon-Macquart
- Genre: Novel
- Publisher: Charpentier (book form)
- Publication date: 1888 (book form)
- Publication place: France
- English publication date: 2018
- Media type: Print (Serial, Hardback & Paperback)
- Pages: 256 (paperback)
- Preceded by: Money
- Followed by: The Conquest of Plassans

Le rêve (lit. 'The Dream') is the sixteenth novel in the Rougon-Macquart series by Émile Zola. It is about an orphan girl who falls in love with a nobleman, and is set in the years 1860–1869.

The novel was published by Charpentier in October 1888 and translated into English by Eliza E. Chase as The Dream in 1893 (reprinted in 2005). Other recent translations are by Michael Glencross (Peter Owen 2005), Andrew Brown (Hesperus Press 2005), and Paul Gibbard (Oxford World's Classics 2018).

== Plot summary ==
Le rêve is a simple tale of the orphan Angélique Marie (b. 1851), adopted by a couple of embroiderers, the Huberts, whose marriage is blighted by a childlessness which they attribute to a curse uttered by Mme Hubert's mother on her deathbed. Angélique is enthralled by the tales of the saints and martyrs — particularly Saint Agnes and Saint George — as told in the Golden Legend of Jacobus de Voragine. Her dream is to be saved by a handsome prince and to live happily ever after, in the same way the virgin martyrs have their faiths tested on earth before being rescued and married to Jesus in heaven.

Her dream is realized when she falls in love with Félicien d'Hautecœur, the last in an old family of knights, heroes, and nobles in the service of Christ and of France. His father, the present Monseigneur, objects to their marrying for reasons of his own. (Before entering the Church he had married for love a woman much younger than himself; when she died giving birth to Félicien, he sent the child away and took holy orders.) Angélique falls ill and pines away. Won over by her virtue and innocence, the Monseigneur finally relents and the lovers are married; but Angélique dies on the steps of the cathedral as she kisses her husband for the first time. Her death, however, is a happy one: her innocence has freed the Huberts and the Monseigneur from their curses.

According to Robert J. Niess, the model for "the engaging figure of Félicien d'Hautecoeur" was Zola's "brilliant and unfortunate friend, the gifted painter Frédéric Bazille, who died in the first days of the Franco-Prussian War."

== Relation to the other Rougon-Macquart novels ==
Zola's plan for the Rougon-Macquart novels was to show how heredity and environment worked on members of one family over the course of the Second French Empire. All of the descendants of Adelaïde Fouque (Tante Dide), Angélique's great-grandmother, demonstrate what today would be called obsessive-compulsive behaviors. Angélique is obsessed with the lives of the saints and with her dream of a princely marriage.

Furthermore, Angélique has a temper and experiences serious mood swings, becoming as passionate as any one of her relatives. Zola strongly implies that, without the upbringing by her adoptive parents and the influence of the cathedral and The Golden Legend, Angélique could easily have been fallen prey to her passions and ended up as a prostitute (like her cousin Nana).

In Le docteur Pascal, Zola describes Angélique as being a blend of the characteristics of her parents to such a degree that no trace of them shows up in the child. Angélique's mother is Sidonie Rougon, who plays a significant (though brief) role in La curée and appears briefly in L'œuvre. (Angélique's father is unknown.) Sidonie is unfeeling and nearly inhuman, a cold, dry woman incapable of love. She is a professional procuress, involved in every shady calling, a seller of "anything and everything."

In Le docteur Pascal (set in 1872), it is revealed that Sidonie has become the austere financial manager of a home for unwed mothers.

== English Translations ==
=== Expurgated ===
- The Dream (1893, tr. Eliza E. Chase, Chatto & Windus)

=== Unexpurgated ===
1. The Dream (2005, Michael Glencross, Peter Owen)
2. The Dream (2005, Andrew Brown, Hesperus Press)
3. The Dream (2018, Paul Gibbard, Oxford University Press)

== Adaptations ==
The novel was dramatized as an opera of the same name in four acts composed by Alfred Bruneau, produced June 18, 1891, at the Opéra-Comique to a libretto by Louis Gallet.

It was also adapted as two French films, both called Le Rêve and both directed by Jacques de Baroncelli: one in 1921 (a silent film) and one in 1931.

== Sources ==
- Brown, F. (1995). Zola: A life. New York: Farrar, Straus & Giroux.
- Zola, E. Le doctor Pascal, translated as Doctor Pascal by E.A. Vizetelly (1893).
- Zola, E. Le rêve, translated as The Dream by Andrew Brown (Hesperus Press 2005).
