= Le Ventre de Paris =

1873 novel by Émile Zola

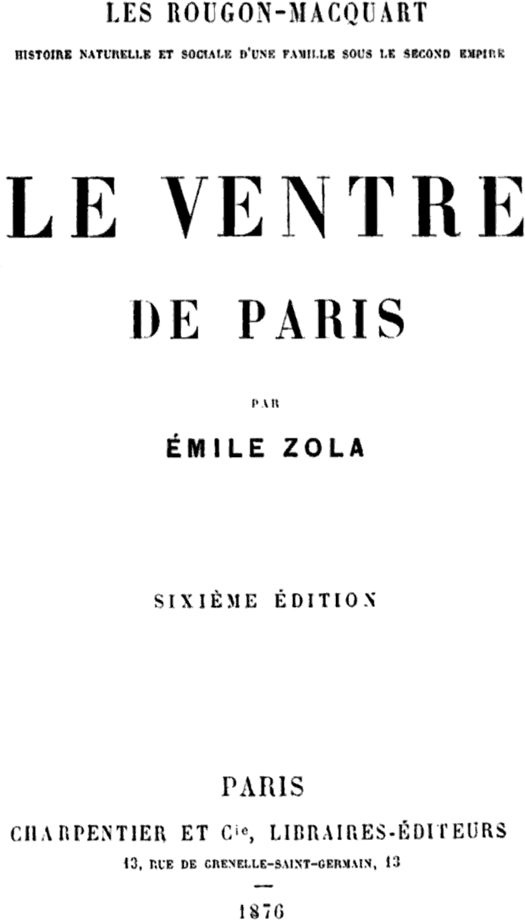
- Author: Émile Zola
- Translator: Brian Nelson
- Language: French
- Series: Les Rougon-Macquart
- Genre: Novel
- Publication date: 1873
- Publication place: France
- English publication date: 2007
- Pages: 320 (paperback)
- Preceded by: A Love Story
- Followed by: The Bright Side of Life

Le Ventre de Paris (French pronunciation: [lə vɑ̃tʁ də paʁi], lit. 'The Belly of Paris') is the third novel in French published in 1873 by writer Émile Zola's twenty-volume series Les Rougon-Macquart. It is set in and around Les Halles, the enormous, busy central market of 19th-century Paris. Les Halles, rebuilt in cast iron and glass during the Second Empire was a landmark of modernity in the city, the wholesale and retail center of a thriving food industry. Le Ventre de Paris is Zola's first novel entirely on the working class.

The protagonist is Florent, an escaped political prisoner mistakenly arrested after the French coup of 1851. He returns to his half-brother Quenu, a charcutier and his wife Lisa Quenu (formerly Macquart), with whom he finds refuge. They get him a job in the market as a fish inspector. After getting mixed up in an ineffectual socialist plot against the Empire, Florent is arrested and deported again.

Although Zola had yet to hone his mastery of working-class speech and idioms displayed to such good effect in L'Assommoir, the novel conveys a powerful atmosphere of life in the great market halls and of working class suffering. There are a number of vivid descriptive passages, the most famous of which, his description of the olfactory sensations experienced upon entering a cheese shop, has become known as the "Cheese Symphony" due to its ingenious orchestral metaphors. Throughout the book, the painter Claude Lantier, a relative of the Macquarts and later the protagonist of L'Œuvre (1886) - shows up to provide a semi-authorial commentary, playing the role of chorus.

== English Translations ==
Le ventre de Paris was originally translated into English by Henry Vizetelly and published in 1888 under the title Fat and Thin. After Vizetelly's imprisonment for obscene libel the novel was one of those revised and expurgated by his son, Ernest Alfred Vizetelly; this mutilated version entitled The Fat and the Thin appeared in 1896 and has been reprinted many times. Until 2007 this remained the only English version widely available. Henry's original full edition was afterward reprinted in Paris for adventurous English readers. The novel was newly translated in 1955 by David Hughes and Marie-Jacqueline Mason for Elek Books under the title Savage Paris but this has long been out of print. Oxford World's Classics published a new translation by Brian Nelson entitled The Belly of Paris in 2007 and Modern Library published a new translation by Mark Kurlansky in 2009.

=== Expurgated ===
1. La Belle Lisa or The Paris Market Girls (1882, tr. Mary Neal Sherwood, T. B. Peterson Bros.)
2. The Fat and the Thin (1888, tr. unknown for H. Vizetelly, Vizetelly & Co.)
3. The Fat and the Thin (1896, tr. E. A. Vizetelly, Chatto & Windus)

=== Unexpurgated ===
1. Savage Paris (1955, tr. David Hughes & Marie-Jacqueline Mason, Elek Books)
2. The Belly of Paris (2007, tr. Brian Nelson, Oxford University Press)
3. The Belly of Paris (2009, tr. Mark Kurlansky, Modern Library)
