= Ernest Alfred Vizetelly =

English journalist and author

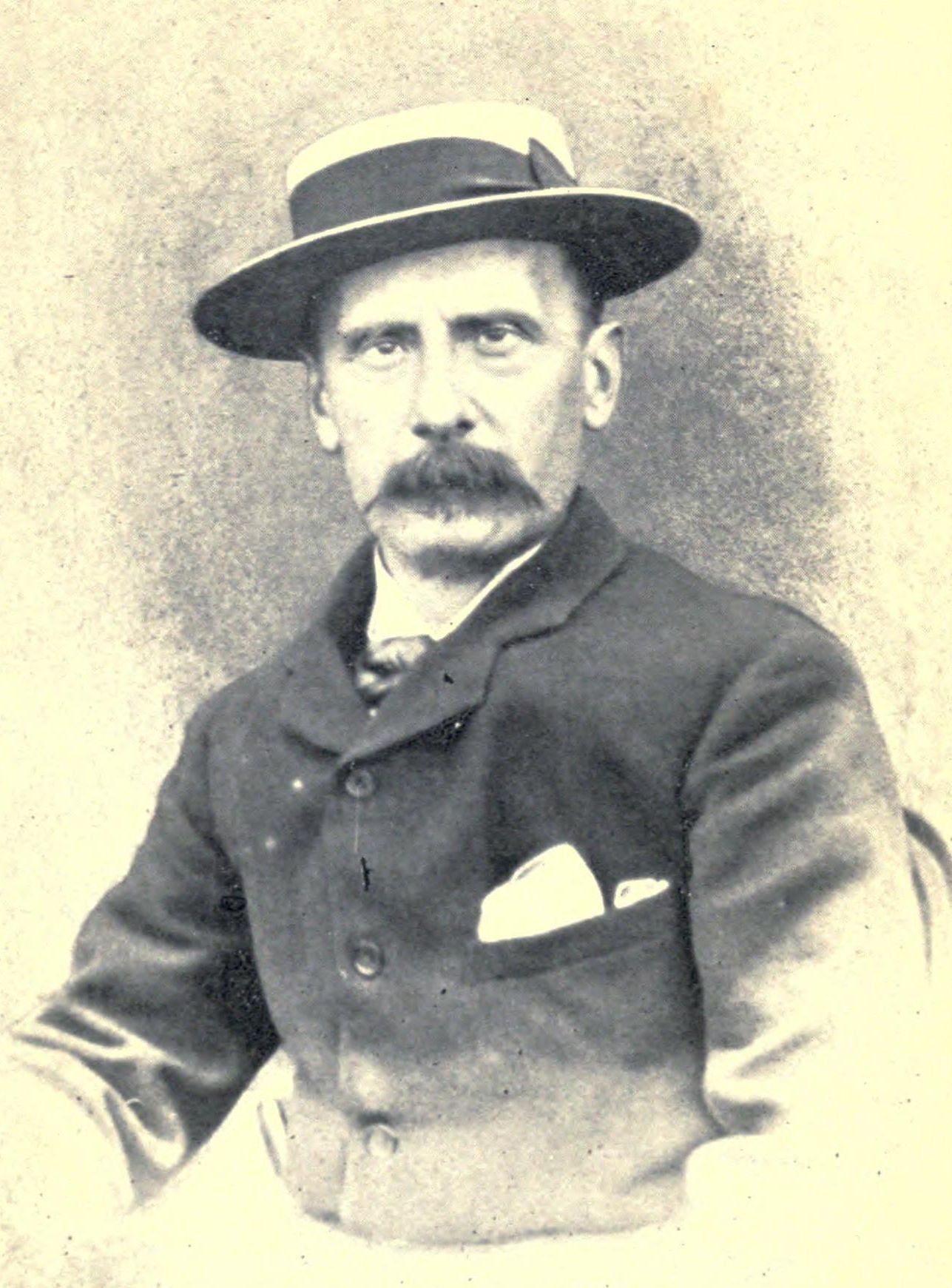
- Born: 1853
- Died: 1922
- Occupation: Writer, translator, war correspondent, historian
- Language: English language, French language

Ernest Alfred Vizetelly (1853–1922) was an English journalist, author and translator, best known for translating and editing the works of French novelist Émile Zola into English. He also worked as a war correspondent and published a memoir of his experiences during the Siege of Paris in the Franco-Prussian War.

== Life ==
He was a son of the English publisher Henry Vizetelly, by his first marriage to Ellen Elizabeth Pollard. He was known as a war correspondent.

Ernest was present with his father at the Siege of Paris during the Franco-Prussian War and wrote a memoir of his experiences, My Days of Adventure: The Fall of France, 1870–71, which also contains an autobiographical introduction.

He edited some translations of Émile Zola's works that had previously been published by his father between 1884 and 1889, as well as producing his own translations.

When Zola fled France for England during the Dreyfus Affair in 1898, Vizetelly supported and advised Zola.

== Translations and editions of Zola ==
Many of Ernest Vizetelly's translations of Zola were based on work done by anonymous translators who, each to some degree, expurgated the texts. Following the publication of the translation of La Terre, Vizetelly & Co. was prosecuted for obscenity by the National Vigilance Association, causing him to re-edit, rewrite, and further bowdlerize the English versions of the Rougon-Macquart series, and as such they are almost universally considered to be of inferior quality.

- The Downfall, translated by E. A. Vizetelly (London: Chatto & Windus, 1893)
- Doctor Pascal, translated by E. A. Vizetelly (London: Chatto & Windus, 1894)
- Money, translated by Ernest A. Vizetelly (London: Chatto & Windus, 1894)
- The Ladies' Paradise, edited with an introduction by Ernest Alfred Vizetelly (London: Hutchinson & Co., 1895)
- A Love Episode, translated with a preface by E. A. Vizetelly (London: Hutchinson & Co., 1895)
- The Fat and the Thin, translated with an introduction by E. A. Vizetelly (London: Chatto & Windus, 1896)
- The Dram Shop, edited with an introduction by E. A. Vizetelly (London: Chatto & Windus, 1897)
- His Excellency, edited with a preface by Ernest A. Vizetelly (London: Chatto & Windus, 1897)
- The Fortune of the Rougons, edited with an introduction by Ernest Alfred Vizetelly (London: Chatto & Windus, 1898)
- Abbé Mouret's Transgression, edited with an introduction by Ernest Alfred Vizetelly (London: Chatto & Windus, 1900)
- The Conquest of Plassans, edited with an introduction by Ernest Alfred Vizetelly (London: Chatto & Windus, 1900)
- Germinal, edited with a preface by E. A. Vizetelly (London: Chatto & Windus, 1901)
- The Joy of Life, edited with a preface by E. A. Vizetelly (London: Chatto & Windus, 1901)
- His Masterpiece, edited with a preface by E. A. Vizetelly (London: Chatto & Windus, 1902)
- The "Trois Villes" series: I, "Lourdes," II, "Rome," and III, "Paris," as translated by Ernest A. Vizetelly, (The Three City, 1899) is published in London by Chatto and Windus, in New York by the Macmillan Co.
- "Fruitfulness" ("Fécondité"), translated by E. A. Vizetelly. London, Chatto; New York, Doubleday.
- "Work" ("Travail"), translated by E. A. Vizetelly. London, Chatto.
- "Truth" ("Vérité"), translated by E. A. Vizetelly. London, Chatto; New York, John Lane.
