= La Débâcle =

Novel by Émile Zola published in 1892

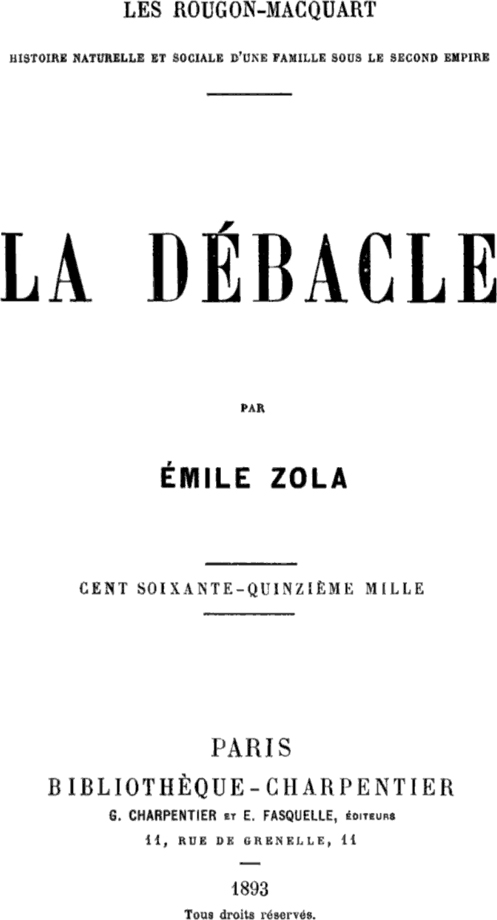
- Author: Émile Zola
- Translator: Leonard Tancock
- Language: French
- Series: Les Rougon-Macquart
- Genre: Novel
- Publisher: Charpentier (book form)
- Publication date: 1892
- Publication place: France
- English publication date: 1972
- Media type: Print (serial, hardback & paperback)
- Pages: 592 (paperback)
- Preceded by: The Earth
- Followed by: Doctor Pascal

La Débâcle (1892), translated as The Debacle and The Downfall, is the penultimate novel of Émile Zola's Les Rougon-Macquart series, which first appeared as a serial in La Vie populaire from 21 February to 21 July 1892, before being published in book form by Charpentier.

The story is set against the background of the political and military tumults that ended the reign of Napoléon III and the Second Empire in 1870, in particular the Franco-Prussian War, the Battle of Sedan, and the Paris Commune.

Despite the hostility with which it was initially received by Bonapartists, monarchists, and in particular by veterans of the French army, La Débâcle was Zola's greatest commercial success, selling a hundred and fifty thousand copies within five months of its release.

== Plot ==
The novel starts in the summer of 1870, when after serious diplomatic tensions, France has declared war on Prussia (the nucleus of Germany which was then emerging as one nation out of a number of disparate cities, regions and principalities). The French hoped to achieve a quick victory by marching their armies east, straight to Berlin. Instead, the Prussian armies crossed the Rhine before the French, beat the French Rhine army into retreat and invaded France.

The novel is by far the longest of the Rougon-Macquart series. Its main character is Jean Macquart, a farmer who after having lost his wife and land (in the novel La Terre), has joined the army for the campaign of 1870. The main theme is the brutality of war for the common soldier and for the civilian population, hit by the death of family and friends and by economic hardship. It is written in three parts.

In the first part, the French army corps in which Jean Macquart is a corporal moves to the southern part of the Rhine valley, only to retreat to Belfort. Reacting to the crushing defeat of another corps in Alsace and the Prussian advance through the Vosges, Macquart's corps is moved by train back to Paris and then to Reims without having seen battle. The growing demoralisation and fatigue of the French soldiers as they are ordered back and forth in pointless manoeuvres is poignantly described. A growing disorganisation of the army becomes apparent as it is unable to move food and equipment to where it is needed. The army corps of Jean is then moved to Reims from which it is supposed to march to the eastern French city of Metz, where another French army is besieged by the Prussians. In a reaction to pressure and movements by the Prussians, the march deviates from its original objective to the north and the French army ends up in the neighbourhood of the town of Sedan, in the Meuse river valley, near the Belgian border. Jean has befriended Maurice, a soldier whose sister Henriette lives in Sedan.

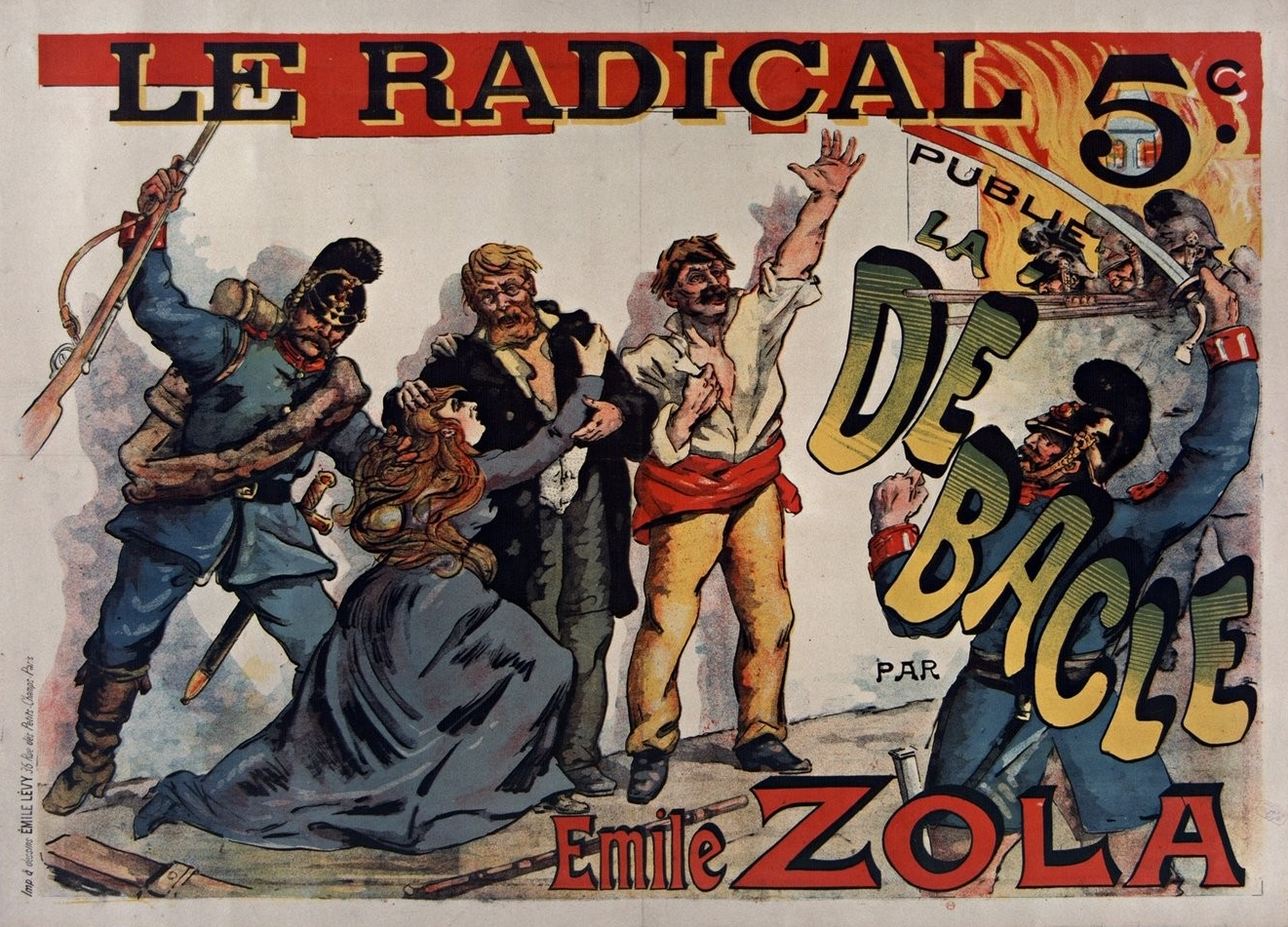
Scene from Part 2, Chapter 4, in which Henriette's husband Weiss is about to be executed for taking up arms against the Prussian Army.

The second part describes the battle of Sedan. During this battle, the Prussian army encircles Sedan and moves its artillery to the hills surrounding the city, trapping the French in the valley in a desperate position. The French army fails to break the encirclement. The part describes the battle as seen by the protagonists, Jean, Maurice, Henriette and Weiss, her husband, a civilian, who dies defending his house against the Prussians as they invade his village. The battle ends with the French army being beaten back to Sedan and capitulating to the threat of the Prussian artillery to destroy Sedan and everyone in it. The Emperor and the French army at Sedan become prisoners of war.

In the third part, the French army is held prisoner for a week, after which it is marched to Germany. Jean and Maurice manage to escape. Jean is wounded during the escape and ends up in the neighbourhood of Sedan where he is hidden and nursed by Henriette, the healing taking until winter. After a while, Maurice moves to Paris, encircled by the Prussians during the winter and early spring of 1871. In the spring of 1871, Jean has rejoined the French army at the service of a new government, which has negotiated an armistice with the Prussians. The Paris Commune, a popular uprising, takes place in Paris, fuelled by the humiliation of the armistice. The French government breaks the uprising, during which Jean mortally wounds Maurice, who fights on the side of the insurgents. The novel ends by bringing three of its main characters together, Jean, the dying Maurice and his sister Henriette who has travelled to Paris after having lost contact with her brother for more than two months.

== English Translations ==
La Débâcle has been translated into English six times, as The Downfall by Ernest Vizetelly for Chatto & Windus in 1892; by Elizabeth Pennell Robins for Cassell in 1892; and by W.M. Sloane for D. Appleton & Co. in 1902. John Hands and Leonard Tancock both translated the work as The Debacle, for Elek Books in 1968, and for Penguin in 1972, respectively. The sixth and most recent translation by Elinor Dorday appeared under its original French title as an Oxford World's Classic in 2000.

Graham King criticizes Vizetelly's translation of La Debacle for its use of unrealistic dialogue between the French soldiers and his excessive attention to unimportant details; E.P. Robins's translation is only described as being done "very well".

With regard to two of the other translations, King writes, "Tancock . . . sacrifices style for precision and while his is the most literally correct modern translation, Hands's licence with the original results in a more readable narrative".

Classics Illustrated published a comic book version of The Downfall in the 1950s. The artwork was by novelist and comic book illustrator Lou Cameron. This was reissued in a restored format in 2018. Despite the necessary shortening and simplification of Zola's large novel, the comic book version shows the battles, and the tragedy of the Paris Commune when French Army troops were sent to crush the rebels.

=== Expurgated ===
1. The Downfall (1892, tr. E. A. Vizetelly, Chatto & Windus)
2. The Downfall or The Smash-up (1898, tr. E. P. Robins, The Cassell Co.)
3. The Downfall (1902, tr. W. M. Sloane, P. F. Collier & Son)

=== Unexpurgated ===
1. The Debacle (1968, tr. John Hands, Elek Books)
2. The Debacle (1972, tr. Leonard Tancock, Penguin Books)
3. La Débâcle (2000, tr. Elinor Dorday, Oxford University Press)

== Reception ==
An anonymous reviewer in The Athenæum wrote,

When, a few weeks ago, the novel was published, it was found that though the subject was one which lends itself to naturalistic treatment of the most lurid order, and though the details of military life were depicted on naturalistic lines, yet the particular form of naturalism which has disfigured the page of Zola, even in the eyes of his sincerest admirers, was conspicuously absent. ... in La Débâcle, which treats of the horrors of war with microscopic detail, the author maintains an absolute silence on some of the worst features of a campaign which amateurs of the morbid and horrible would have expected M. Zola to make ghoulish and effective use of.

According to Benjamin W. Wells,

...it is a book for which modern literature is distinctly the richer. War is the scene of countless tales, but we have never had the like of this to bring before us with startling reality what war means; not to the general in his tent, but to the soldier in the field; how it rouses sometimes the best, more often the worst in our nature ...
