= Son Excellence Eugène Rougon =

1876 novel by Émile Zola

- Title page for Son Excellence Eugène Rougon (1876)
- Author: Émile Zola
- Translator: Brian Nelson
- Language: French
- Series: Les Rougon-Macquart
- Genre: Novel
- Publisher: Charpentier (book form)
- Publication date: 1876
- Publication place: France
- English publication date: 2018
- Media type: Print (serial, hardback & paperback)
- Pages: 384 (paperback)
- Preceded by: The Fortune of the Rougons
- Followed by: The Kill

Son Excellence Eugène Rougon is the sixth novel in the Rougon-Macquart series by Émile Zola. It was serialized in 1876 in Le Siècle before being published in novel form by Charpentier.

The novel is set in the highest echelons of Second Empire government. It follows the career of Eugène Rougon and a dozen or so of his cronies as they jockey for political favor and personal gain, and embraces the public and personal life of Emperor Napoleon III.

The main character is Eugène Rougon (b. 1811), the eldest son of Pierre and Félicité Rougon. Eugène is first introduced in La fortune des Rougon as a key player in the coup d'état of 1851 which established Napoleon III as Emperor of the French. Eugène's maneuverings establish his parents' control over the town of Plassans and lay the foundations for solidifying the family fortune. Eugène, acknowledged as one of the prime movers in legitimizing the Emperor, has remained in Paris to further his quest for power.

Eugène's brothers are Pascal, who is the main character of Le docteur Pascal, and Aristide, whose story is told in La curée and L'argent. He also has two sisters: Sidonie, who appears in La curée, and Marthe, one of the protagonists of La conquête de Plassans.

== Plot summary ==
The novel opens in 1856 with Rougon's career at a low ebb. In conflict with the Emperor over an inheritance claim involving a relative of the Empress, Rougon resigns from his position as premier of the Corps législatif before he can be dismissed. This puts the plans and dreams of Rougon's friends in limbo, as they are counting on his political influence to win various personal favors. His greatest ally and his greatest adversary is Clorinde Balbi, an Italian woman of dubious background and devious intent. Clorinde desires power as much as Rougon does but, because she is a woman, she is forced to act behind the scenes. Rougon refuses to marry her because he believes two such dominant personalities would inevitably destroy each other. Instead, he encourages her to marry M. Delestang, a man of great wealth who can easily be wheedled, while he himself takes a respectable nonentity of a wife who will not hinder his ambition.

Rougon learns of an assassination plot against the Emperor, but decides to do nothing about it. In consequence, after the attempt is made (the Orsini incident of 1858), the Emperor makes him Minister of the Interior with power to maintain peace and national security at any cost. Rougon uses this as an opportunity to punish his political adversaries, deport anti-imperialists by the hundreds, and reward his loyal friends with honors, commissions, and political appointments. Through his influence, Delestang is made Minister of Agriculture and Commerce.

As Rougon's power expands, however, his cronies begin to desert him despite his fulfilling their personal requests. They feel that he has not done enough for them and what he has done either has not been good enough or has had consequences so disastrous as to be no help at all. Moreover, they consider him ungrateful, given all the work they claim to have done to have him reinstated as Minister. Eventually, Rougon is involved in several great scandals based on the favors he has shown to his inner circle.

At the center of all this conflict is Clorinde. As Rougon's power has grown, so has hers, until she has influence at the highest level and on an international scale, including as the Emperor's mistress. Now having the upper hand, she is able to punish Rougon for his refusal to marry her. To silence political and personal opposition, Rougon decides to submit his resignation to the Emperor, confident that it will not be accepted. However, it is accepted, and Delestang is made Minister of the Interior, the implication being that both actions are founded on Clorinde’s authority over the Emperor.

The novel ends in 1862. The Emperor has returned Rougon to service as Minister without Portfolio, giving him unprecedented powers in the wake of Italian unification. Ostensibly, the appointment is meant to reconfigure the country on less imperialistic, more liberal lines, but in reality Rougon has a free hand to crush resistance, curtail opposition, and control the press.

== Historical basis ==
In a preface to the English translation (His Excellency. London: Chatto & Windus), Vizetelly states that. in his opinion:

"with all due allowance for its somewhat limited range of subject, Son Excellence Eugene Rougon is the one existing French novel which gives the reader a fair general idea of what occurred in political spheres at an important period of the Empire. But His Excellency Eugene Rougon is not, as many critics and others have supposed, a mere portrait or caricature of His Excellency Eugène Rouher, the famous Vice-Emperor of history. Symbolism is to be found in every one of Zola's novels, and Rougon, in his main lines, is but the symbol of a principle, or, to be accurate, the symbol of a certain form of the principle of authority. His face is Rouher's, like his build and his favorite gesture; but with Rouher's words, actions, opinions, and experiences are blended those of half a dozen other personages. He is the incarnation of that craving, that lust for power which impelled so many men of ability to throw all principle to the winds and become the instruments of an abominable system of government. And his transformation at the close of the story is in strict accordance with historical facts."

== Relation to the other Rougon-Macquart novels ==
Zola's plan for the Rougon-Macquart novels was to show how heredity and environment worked on members of one family over the course of the Second Empire. All of the descendants of Adelaïde Fouque (Tante Dide), Eugène's grandmother, demonstrate what today would be called obsessive-compulsive behaviors to varying degrees. Eugène is obsessed with power and controlling the lives of others, as Zola makes clear in chapter 6:

"With him it was love of power for sheer power's sake, a love, what is more, untrammelled by any craving for personal glory or wealth or honours. Shockingly ignorant and terribly mediocre in all but the management of other men, it was only by his need to dominate others that he really rose to any height. He loved the mere effort of it, and worshipped his own ability." (trans. Alec Brown) ["C'était, chez lui, un amour du pouvoir pour le pouvoir, dégagé des appétits de vanité, de richesses, d'honneurs. D'une ignorance crasse, d'une grande médiocrité dans toutes les choses étrangères au maniement des hommes, il ne devenait véritablement supérieur que par ses besoins de domination. Là, il aimait son effort, il idolâtrait son intelligence."]

Eugène also resembles his avaricious parents Pierre and Félicité. Their desire for power over their hometown of Plassans becomes in Eugène a desire for power on a national scale. (In this, he shows an affinity to his brothers Aristide, who lusts for money, and Pascal, who thirsts for knowledge.) Zola also strongly suggests that the corrupt environment of Second Empire politics and society is what allows Eugène's personality and desire for power to be nurtured and fulfilled.

In La conquête de Plassans (set in 1864-1865), Eugène is the unnamed "friend" who sends Abbé Faujas to Plassans to solidify support for the Emperor there.

In L'argent (which opens in 1864), Eugène's refusal to help his brother Aristide after a financial setback by the latter is the catalyst for the novel, spurring Aristide to ruthless and unethical speculations that eventually lead to the financial ruination of thousands. To disassociate himself from the scandal and to keep Aristide from prison, Eugène arranges for his brother's exile to Belgium.

In Le docteur Pascal (set in 1872), Zola tells us that Eugène becomes a deputy in the legislative assembly and remains a staunch defender of the Emperor and the Empire after the Franco-Prussian War. He has no children.

== English translations ==
=== Expurgated ===
1. Clorinda or The Rise and Reign of His Excellency Eugène Rougon (1880, tr. Mary Neal Sherwood, T.B. Peterson & Bros.)
2. His Excellency Eugène Rougon (1886, tr. unknown for H. Vizetelly, Vizetelly & Co.)

=== Unexpurgated ===
1. His Excellency (1958, tr. Alec Brown, Elek Books)
2. His Excellency Eugène Rougon (2018, tr. Brian Nelson, Oxford University Press)

== Sources ==
- Brown, F. (1995). Zola: A life. New York: Farrar, Straus & Giroux.
- Zola, É. Le doctor Pascal, translated as Doctor Pascal by E.A. Vizetelly (1893).
- Zola, É. Son Excellence Eugène Rougon, translated as His Excellency by E.A. Vizetelly (1897).
- Zola, É. Son Excellence Eugène Rougon, translated as His Excellency by Alec Brown (1958).
