= Hippolyte Lucas =

French entomologist

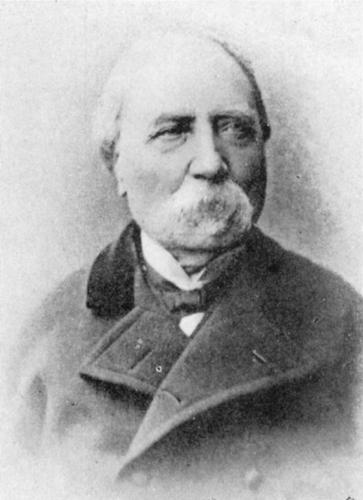
Hippolyte Lucas

Pierre-Hippolyte Lucas (17 January 1814 – 5 July 1899) was a French entomologist.

Lucas was an assistant-naturalist at the Muséum national d'Histoire naturelle. From 1839 to 1842 he studied fauna as part of the scientific commission on the exploration of Algeria.

His brother was Prosper Lucas.

== Works ==
- Histoire naturelle des lépidoptères exotiques. Ouvrage orné de 200 figures peintes d'après nature par Pauquet et gravées sur acier. Paris, Pauquet, Bibliothèque Zoologique, 1835.
- Histoire naturelle des animaux articulés. Exploration scientifique de l'Algérie, pendant les années 1840, 1841 et 1842. Paris, Imprimerie Nationale (1844–1849). Published in 25 volumes this work contains 122 fine engraved plates.
- "Description de nouvelles Espèces de Lépidoptères appartenant aux Collections entomologiques du Musée de Paris". Revue et magasin de zoologie pure et appliquée. (2) 4 (3): 128–141 (1852) 4 (4): 189–198 (1852) 4 (6): 290–300 (1852) 4 (7): 324–343 (1852) 4 (9): 422–432, pl. 10 (1852) 5 (7): 310–322 (1853).
- "Animaux nouveaux ou rares, recuillis pendant l'expédition dans les parties centrales de l'Amérique du Sud, de Rio de Janeiro a Lima et de Lima au Pará; executée par ordre du gouvernement français pendant les années 1843 a 1847 sous la direction du Comte Francis de Castelnau". Entomologie Voy. Cast. 3: 197–199, pl. 1–2 (Lepidoptera) [1859].
- Essai sur les animaux articulés qui habitent l'île de Crète
