= Prosper Lucas =

French medical doctor and author (1808–1885)

Prosper Lucas (4 November 1808, Saint-Brieuc – 2 April 1885, Mennecy) was a French medical doctor and a specialist in the study of heredity. Regarding the topic of biological inheritance, Lucas published his "Traité philosophique et physiologique de l'hérédité naturelle" ("Philosophical and physiological treatise on natural heredity") in two volumes in 1847 and 1850, which Charles Darwin described in The Origin of Species (1859) as "the fullest and the best on this subject".

The full title of Lucas' treatise was Traité philosophique et physiologique de l'hérédité naturelle dans les états de santé et de maladie du système nerveux, avec l'application méthodique des lois de la procréation au traitement général des affections dont elle est le principe. Ouvrage où la question est considérée dans ses rapports avec les lois primordiales, les théories de la génération, les causes déterminantes de la sexualité, les modifications acquises de la nature originelle des êtres, et les diverses formes de névropathie et d'aliénation mentale ("Philosophical and physiological treatise of natural inheritance in the states of health and disease of the nervous system, with the methodical application of the laws of procreation to the general treatment of the affections of which it is the principle. Work where the question is considered in its relation to the primordial laws, theories of generation, the determining causes of sexuality, the acquired modifications of the original nature of beings, and the various forms of neuropathy and insanity").

Prosper Lucas wrote his thesis and presented it on 28 August 1833, at the Faculté de Médecine de Paris: "De l'imitation contagieuse ou de la propagation sympathique des névroses et des mouvements". In 1864, he replaced Louis-Victor Marcé as physician for the insane at the Bicêtre, followed by an appointment as chief physician of the women's division at St. Anne asylum in Paris (1867). In 1882, he became medical director of the lunatic asylum in Le Mans. He was the brother of entomologist Pierre-Hippolyte Lucas (1814–1899).
