= La Faute de l'Abbé Mouret =

1875 novel by Émile Zola

- Author: Émile Zola
- Translator: Valerie Minogue
- Language: French
- Series: Les Rougon-Macquart
- Genre: Novel
- Publication date: 1875
- Publication place: France
- English publication date: 2017
- Media type: Print (Serial, Hardback & Paperback)
- Pages: 352 (paperback)
- Preceded by: The Ladies Paradise/Delight
- Followed by: A Love Story

La Faute de l'Abbé Mouret (1875) is the fifth novel in Émile Zola's twenty-volume series Les Rougon-Macquart. Viciously anticlerical in tone, it follows on from the horrific events at the end of La Conquête de Plassans, focussing this time on a remote Provençal backwater village.

Unusually for Zola, the novel contains very few characters and locations, and its use of amnesia as a plot device gives it an unusually fantastical tone.

== Plot summary ==
The plot centres on the neurotic young priest Serge Mouret, first seen in La Conquête de Plassans, as he takes his orders and becomes the parish priest for the uninterested village of Artauds. The inbred villagers have no interest in religion and Serge is portrayed giving several wildly enthusiastic Masses to his completely empty, near-derelict church. Serge not only seems unperturbed by this state of affairs but actually appears to have positively sought it out especially, for it gives him time to contemplate religious affairs and to fully experience the fervour of his faith. Eventually he has a complete nervous breakdown and collapses into a near-comatose state, whereupon his distant relative, the unconventional doctor Pascal Rougon (the central character of the last novel in the series, 1893's Le Docteur Pascal), places him in the care of the inhabitants of a nearby derelict stately home, Le Paradou.

The novel then takes a complete new direction in terms of both tone and style, as Serge — suffering from amnesia and total long-term memory loss, with no idea who or where he is beyond his first name — is doted upon by Albine, the whimsical, innocent and entirely uneducated girl who has been left to grow up practically alone and wild in the vast, sprawling, overgrown grounds of Le Paradou. The two of them live a life of idyllic bliss with many biblical parallels and over, the course of a number of months, they fall deeply in love with one another; however, at the moment they consummate their relationship, they are discovered by Serge's monstrous former monsignor and his memory is instantly returned to him. Wracked with guilt at his unwitting sins, Serge is plunged into a deeper religious fervour than ever before, and Albine is left bewildered at the loss of her lover. As with many of Zola's earlier works, the novel then builds to a tragic climax where Albine takes her own life by poisoning herself with flower fumes.

== English Translations ==
The novel was translated into English by Vizetelly & Co. in the 1880s as Abbé Mouret's Transgression, but this text must be considered faulty due to its many omissions and bowdlerisations, as well as its rendering of Zola's language in one of his most technically complex novels into a prolix and flat style of Victorian English bearing little resemblance to the original text. Two more faithful translations emerged in the 1950s and 1960s under the titles The Sinful Priest and The Sin of Father Mouret.

=== Expurgated ===
1. Abbé Mouret's Transgression (1886, tr. unknown for H. Vizetelly, Vizetelly & Co.)
2. Abbé Mouret's Transgression (1900, tr. unknown edited by E. A. Vizetelly, Chatto & Windus)
3. The Sin of the Abbé Mouret (1904, tr. M. Smyth, McLaren & Co.)

=== Unexpurgated ===
1. The Abbé Mouret's Sin (1957, tr. Alec Brown, Elek Books, republished as The Sinful Priest in 1960)
2. The Sin of Father Mouret (1969, tr. Sandy Petrey, Prentice-Hall)
3. The Sin of Abbé Mouret (2017, tr. Valerie Minogue, Oxford University Press)

== Adaptations ==
The novel was adapted as the 1970 French film The Demise of Father Mouret, directed by Georges Franju, starring Gillian Hills and Francis Huster. The Austrian composer Gerhard Wimberger has based his opera Paradou (1981/1985) on this novel.

== Influence ==
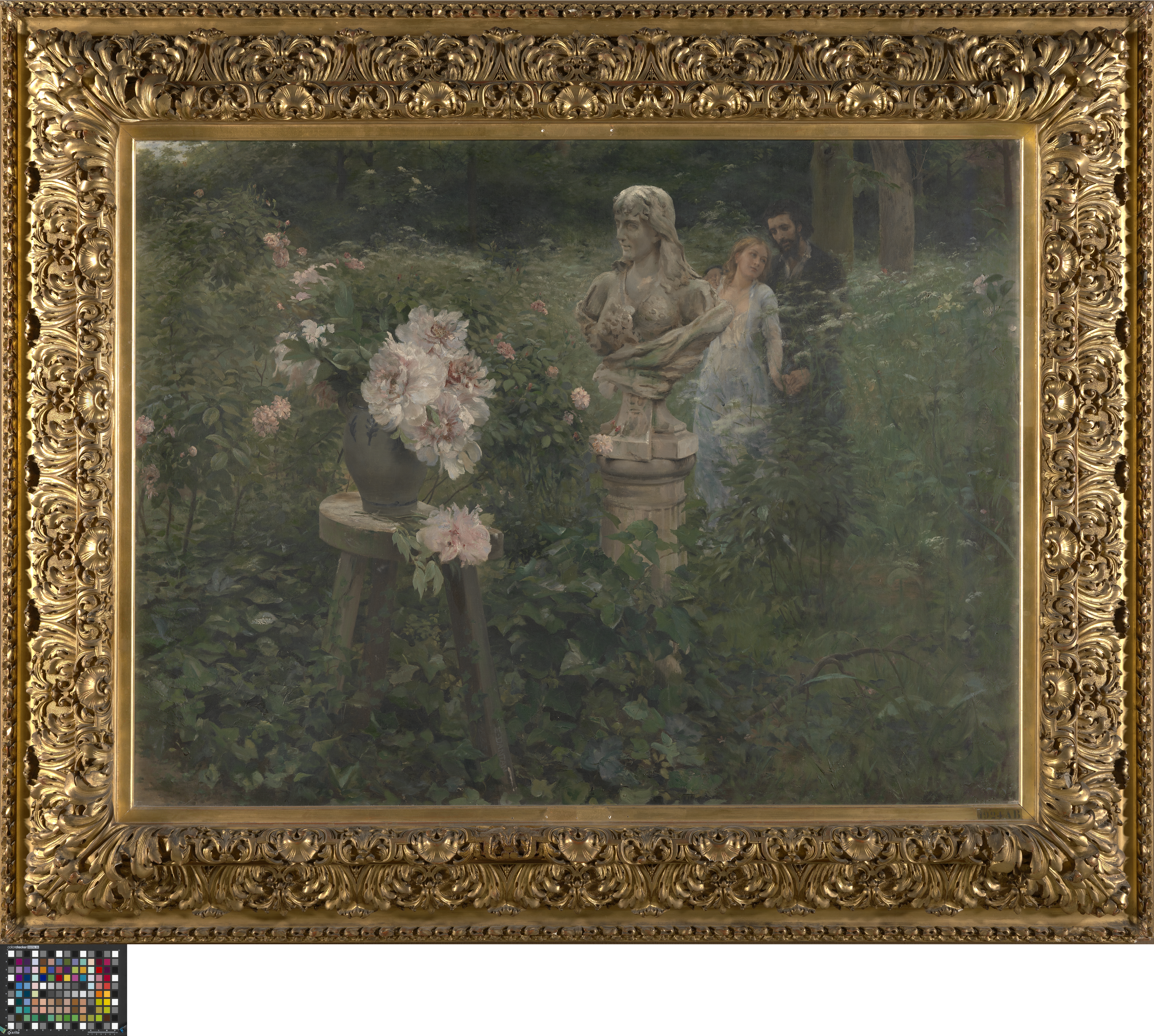
Le Paradou (naar Emile Zola), Édouard Joseph Dantan, 1883, Museum of Fine Arts, Ghent, 1924-AB

The novel inspired a painting by John Collier (1850—1934), exhibited in 1895 at the Royal Academy of Arts in London, under the title The death of Albine. The painting was reproduced in the weekly The Graphic on 31 August 1895 (example in the British Museum, London).The painting was thought to be lost but was discovered in the archives of the Museum of Glasgow and is accessible on-line. It also inspired Joseph Edouard Dantan for his painting Le Paradou (1883; Museum of Fine Arts, Ghent).
