= Brian Nelson (literature professor) =

Professor of French studies

Brian Nelson FAHA is a professor emeritus of French Studies at Monash University, Melbourne.

== Biography ==
Nelson was educated at Spalding Grammar School. He read modern languages (French and Spanish) at Downing College, Cambridge, graduating with First Class Honours in 1968. He earned his D.Phil. at Oxford University (New College) in 1979. He spent the academic year 1970–71 as lecteur d’anglais at the Ecole Normale Supérieure, Paris.

In 1973, he was appointed lecturer in French at Aberystwyth University in Wales, becoming a senior lecturer in 1984. In 1985 he was appointed Professor of French at Monash University. He has held visiting fellowships at New College (Oxford), Indiana University Bloomington US, the Salzburg Global Seminar, the Camargo Foundation (Cassis, France), the Dora Maar House (Ménerbes, France), and the Paris Institute for Advanced Study. He retired in 2008.

== Research and translations ==
Nelson’s research has focused on late 19th century French literature and culture, especially the novels of Emile Zola (1840–1902). He is the author, translator, editor or co-editor of 30 books.

He is the general editor (with Adam Watt) of the new Oxford edition of Marcel Proust’s 7-volume novel In Search of Lost Time (À la recherche du temps perdu, 1913–27), for which he has translated The Swann Way (vol. 1), The Fugitive (vol. 6) and Time Regained (vol. 7). He has written on the nature of translation as a writerly and scholarly act, and on the value of retranslating classic texts. In the Translator’s Note to his edition of Zola’s Germinal, he writes:

Literary translation is a form of close reading and critical interpretation. The translator’s essential task is to capture a writer’s voice, his style. This involves careful attention to verbal patterns and effects—tone, texture, rhythm, register, syntax, structure, all those things that make up style and reflect the marriage of style and meaning. Style is vision. If you don’t get the style, you miss the vision. […] Classic texts such as Germinal are susceptible of multiple translations over time. All translations are interpretations, and they inevitably differ from each other to varying degrees. This is natural, given the passage of time, changes in sensibility, new readings, new readerships. Moreover, retranslations of classic works afford an opportunity to celebrate the richness of the translated text, the art of translation, and language itself.

He is the author of The Cambridge Introduction to French Literature (2015).

== Editorial work and professional service ==
Nelson served as editor of the Australian Journal of French Studies from 2002 to 2020, engaging with the expanding scope of French studies while retaining a focus on literary scholarship. He founded and served as general editor of the book series Monash Romance Studies, which published 21 volumes between 1995 and 2008, and co-founded and co-edited the Journal Romance Studies from 1982 to 1986. He was the founding president of the Australian Society for French Studies from 1994 to 1996 and was made an honorary life member in 2018. He also served as president of the Australian Association for Literary Translation (AALITRA) from 2007 to 2015 and edited The AALITRA Review from 2009 to 2013. In 2015, he helped establish the Australian Academy of the Humanities Medal for Excellence in Translation, securing funding, developing its guidelines, and chairing the panel of experts for the 2016, 2018, 2020 and 2022 awards.

== Awards and honours ==
- Jebb Studentship (University of Cambridge) (1969–71)
- Chevalier dans l'Ordre des Palmes Académiques (2003)
- Runner-up, International Federation of Translators "Aurora Borealis" Prize for Outstanding Translation of Fiction (2011)
- Elected Fellow of the Australian Academy of the Humanities (2011)
- Winner of the Translation Prize, New South Wales Premier's Literary Awards (2015)
- Officier dans l'Ordre des Palmes Academiques(2021)

== Selected publications ==
Critical works

- Zola and the Bourgeoisie: A Study of Themes and Techniques in Les Rougon-Macquart (1982)
- Émile Zola: A Selective Analytical Bibliography (1982)
- The Cambridge Introduction to French Literature (2015)
- Emile Zola: A Very Short Introduction (2020)

Editor

- Naturalism in the European novel: New Critical Perspectives (1992)
- Telling Performances: Essays on gender, narrative and performance (2001)
- Practising Theory: Pierre Bourdieu and the Field of Cultural Production (2004)
- After Blanchot: Literature, Philosophy, Criticism (2005)
- The Cambridge Companion to Zola (2007)
- Perspectives on Literature and Translation: Creation, Circulation, Reception (2013)

Translator

- Emile Zola, The Ladies' Paradise (Oxford, 1995)
- Emile Zola, Pot Luck (Oxford, 1999)
- Emile Zola, The Kill (Oxford, 2004)
- Emile Zola, The Belly of Paris (Oxford, 2007)
- Emile Zola, The Fortune of the Rougons (Oxford, 2012)
- Emile Zola, Earth (Oxford, 2016)
- Emile Zola, His Excellency Eugène Rougon (Oxford, 2018)
- Emile Zola, The Assommoir (Oxford, 2021)
- Marcel Proust, Swann in Love (Oxford, 2017)
- Marcel Proust, The Swann Way (Oxford, 2023)

Festschrift

- Empathy and Imagination: Translation, Zola and the French Nineteenth Century (edited by Rosemary Lloyd), Australian Journal of French Studies 57.1 (2020)
