= Hesperus Press =

- Founded: 2001
- Country of origin: United Kingdom
- Headquarters location: 28 Mortimer Street, London W1W 7RD
- Distribution: BookSource (UK); Trafalgar Square Publishing (US); Nationwide Book Distributors (New Zealand); APD Singapore (Singapore); Jordan Book Center (Middle East)
- Publication types: Books
- Official website: www.hesperus.press

Hesperus Press is an independent publishing house based in London, United Kingdom. It was founded in 2001. The publisher's motto, "Et Remotissima Prope," is a Latin phrase which means "Bringing near what is far". Hesperus Press has published some 300 works by both classic and contemporary authors, including: Dante, Percy Bysshe Shelley, Dickens, Dostoyevsky, Flaubert, Kafka, Tolstoy, Woolf, Annie Dillard, and Aldous Huxley. Their series have included: Hesperus Classics, Hesperus Nova, Hesperus Minor, Brief Lives, Poetic Lives, ON, Modern Voices, and Hesperus Worldwide.

Hesperus was also responsible for publishing the UK edition of the best-seller The Hundred-Year-Old Man Who Climbed Out the Window and Disappeared by Swedish author Jonas Jonasson, released in July 2012. However, in 2015 the High Court ordered Hesperus to stop selling its edition of the book after it failed to pay royalties to the author for 3 years.

According to its 2023 accounts, Hesperus Press currently has no employees.
