= Paul Elek =

British publisher (1906–1976)

Paul Elek (1906–1976) was a British publisher and the founder of the firm Paul Elek Publishers.

== Life and career ==
Born in Budapest, Hungary, in 1906 to a family with a publishing background, Elek migrated to Britain in 1938, having "fallen foul" of the Horthy administration "because of his liberal views".

Upon arrival, he set up, together with his wife Elizabeth, a publishing firm named "Elek Books" (later "Paul Elek Publishers"). During the Second World War, the firm published "technical and scientific books", subject areas that were popular during the war.

From 1943, Paul Elek published a number of "high-class" and often large-format books on art and architecture, including several series, Ancient Cities and Temples, The Making of History, Centres of Art and Civilization, and a short series, name unknown, of highly illustrated books on mediaeval architecture. One of the volumes, Lost Cities of Asia, in the series Centres of Art and Civilization, states that it is the first in a new series, each volume focusing on three cities, but subsequent volumes showed it as part of the original series. In many of the volumes the photography was by Wim Swaan and Edwin Smith, shown below by (WS) and (ES).

Elek published scholarly works on contemporary history, including A. J. Sherman's Island Refuge : Britain and Refugees from the Third Reich, 1933–1939 (1973), "a study of Britain's attitudes to refugees after 1933", and The History of Anti-Semitism (1966– ), a multivolume translation of Léon Poliakov's Histoire de l'antisémitisme.

He also published a number of "popular war reminiscences", including Richard Pape's first book, Boldness Be My Friend, which would save his firm from bankruptcy. That book was an account of Pape's Second World War adventures as a navigator in a Lancaster bomber that was shot down close to the German/Dutch border, and his captures and escapes.

The book was brought to Anthony Blond's London literary agency in 1952 by Vanora McIndoe, the daughter of Sir Archie McIndoe, from Pape who was hospitalized in East Grinstead, and having plastic surgery, following a drunken motorcycle accident on the Isle of Man. After being read and approved by Blond's colleague Isabel Colegate, the book was published by Elek, who gave a £600 advance. It sold 160,000 copies at 16 shillings each, and Elek avoided bankruptcy.

Elek was himself an author who published This Other London (1951) with illustrations by David Knight. He edited the anthology The Age of the Grand Tour (1967).

After his death, his publishing interests – "Paul Elek Ltd..., London, along with its subsidiary companies, Elek Books Ltd and Paul Elek (Scientific Books) Ltd" – were sold to Granada Publishing, whose publishing interests were, in turn, acquired by William Collins, Sons, of Glasgow, in 1988.

== Selected publications ==
The Gothic Cathedral, Wim Swaan (1969)
Castles of Europe, William Anderson (WS) (1970)
Monasteries of the World, Christopher Brooke (WS) (1974)
The Late Middle Ages, Wim Swaan (1977)

Ancient Cities and Temples
Babylon, Albert Champdor (1958)
Jerusalem, Michel Join-Lambert (1958)
Ethiopia, Jean Doresse (1959)
Maya Cities, Paul Rivet (1960)
Carthage, Gilbert Picard (1964)

The Making of History
The Age of Charlemagne, Donald Bullough (ES) (1965)
The Age of Plantagenet and Valois, Kenneth Fowler (WS, ES) (1967)
The Age of Augustus, Donald Earl (1968)

Centres of Art and Civilization
Pompeii & Herculaneum, Marcel Brion (ES) (1960)
Imperial Peking, Lin Yutang (1961)
Venice the Masque of Italy, Marcel Brion (ES) (1962)
Moorish Spain, Enrique Sordo (WS) (1963)
Mecca the Blessed Madinah the Radiant, Emel Esin (1963)
Athens, Angelo Procopiou (ES) (1964)
Constantinople, David Talbot Rice (WS) (1965)
Thebes of the Pharaohs, Charles F. Nims (WS) (1965)
Isfahan, Pearl of Persia, Wilfrid Blunt (WS) (1966)
Lost Cities of Asia, Wim Swaan (1966)
Tibet, Land of Snows, Giuseppe Tucci (WS, ES) (1967)
Morocco, Rom Landau (WS) (1967)
Cities of Mughal India, Gavin Hambly (WS) (1968)
Flemish Cities, William Gaunt (WS) (1969)
Rome, Stewart Perowne (ES) (1971)

Other books
The Medici, Marcel Brion (WS) (1969)
Lucknow: the Last Phase of an Oriental Culture, Abdul Halim Sharar (1975)
The Hindu Temple, George Michell (1977)

== Book series ==
- Ancient Cities and Temples
- Archaeological Sites
- Bestseller Library
- Camden Classics (AKA Camden Illustrated Classics)
- Centres of Art and Civilization
- Environmental Studies
- Fibre Science Series
- Histories of Science Series
- Life and Leisure
- Master Painters
- Masterworks of Choral Music
- Monographs on British Economic Institutions
- Novelists and Their World
- The Making of History
- Psycholinguistics Series
- Science in Action
- Vision of England
