= List of journalists killed during the Mahdist War =

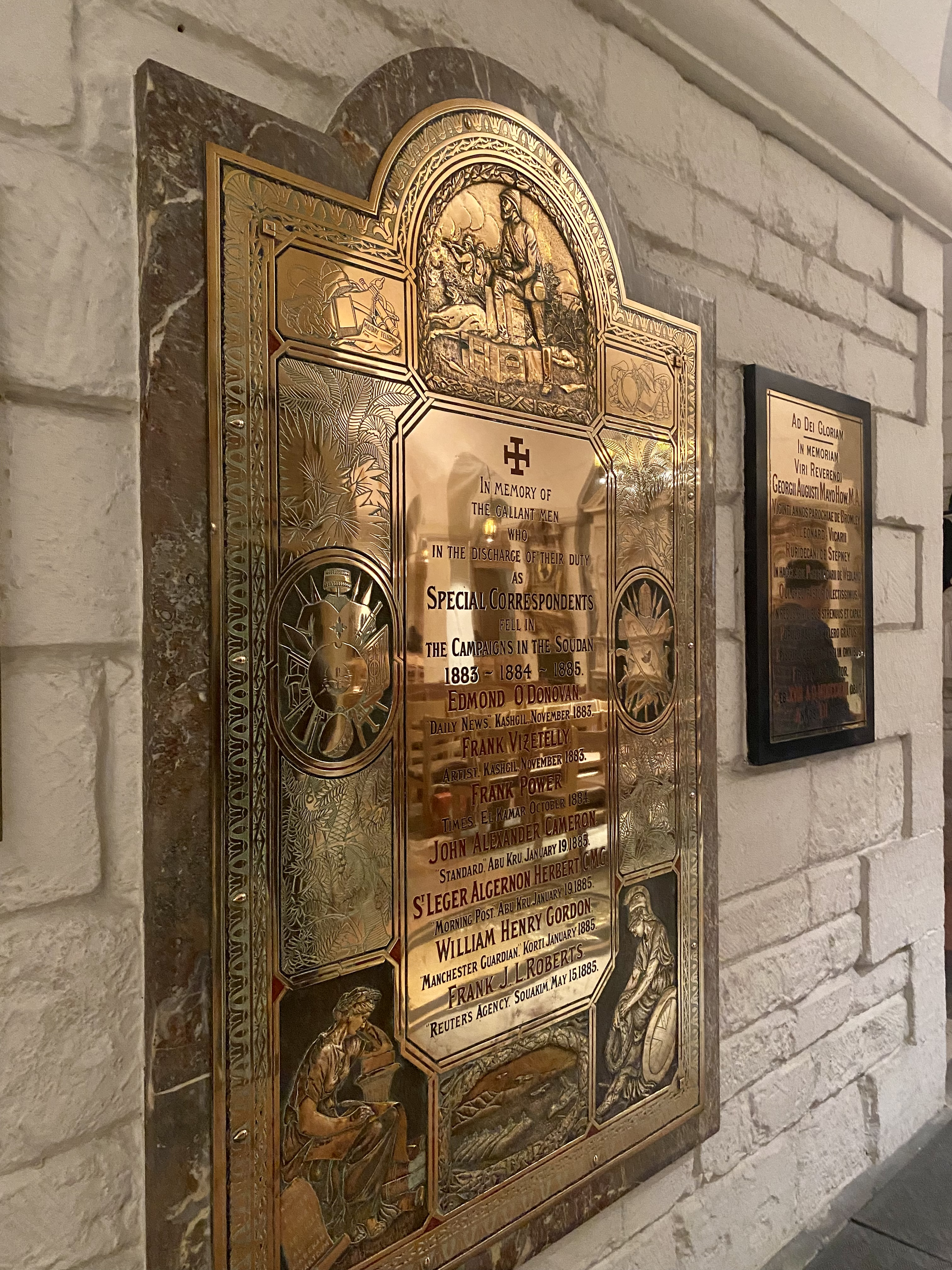
The St Paul's memorial to seven of the journalists killed in the war

This is a list of journalists killed during the Mahdist War. In all about 30 war correspondents covered the war during the period 1883–1885. A war memorial for the seven correspondents who were killed during the Sudan campaigns between those years rests in St Paul's Cathedral in London. One other journalist, who was not listed, was killed in 1898 in one of the final battles of the war. The memorial was the first war memorial devoted to journalists.

== 1883 ==
- Edmund O'Donovan (born 1844), The Daily News, killed along with General William Hicks and the other Europeans at the Battle of El Obeid, 3–5 November 1883
- Frank Vizetelly, illustrator, The Graphic, Kashgil, 3–5 November 1883. He had previously been an illustrator during the US Civil War, where he drew scenes from both the North and the South camps. He was erroneously reported to have been the only survivor and a prisoner, until later reports confirmed his death. While Vizetelly was killed at El Obeid, he was with not with Hicks' party and was outside the square.

== 1884 ==
- Frank Power, The Times, September 1884 the Irish artist, while working with a German-language newspaper, was one of only a few Europeans to survive from the forces at the Battle of El Obeid in November 1883 as he suffered from dysentery and was not with the forces, was able to escape by boat. Power was killed almost a year later in September when the party he was with, led by Colonel Stewart, were attempting to break through a blockade. Powers wanted to reach a point where he could wire a report to The Times. The steamer, however, was grounded and the party was ambushed.

== 1885 ==
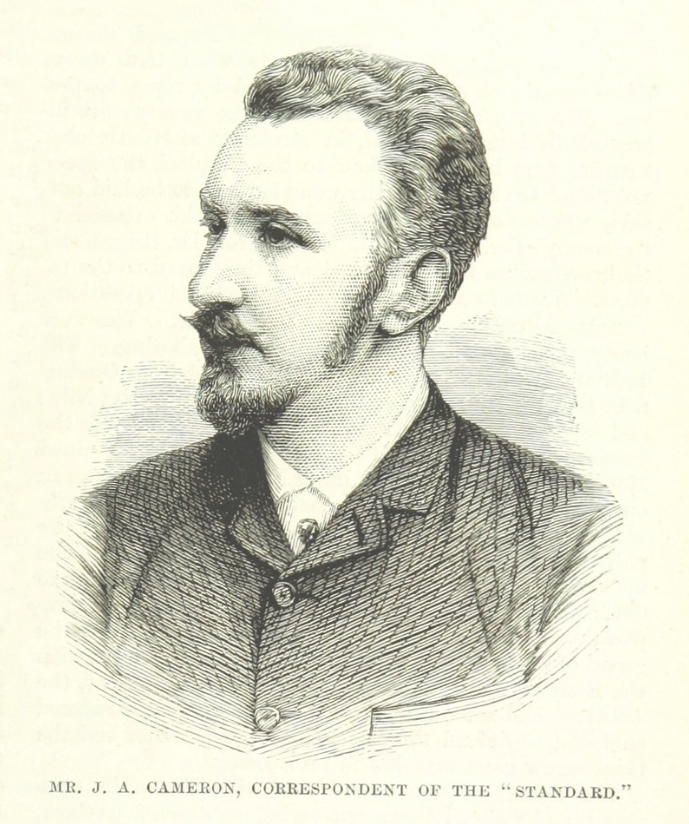
J. A. Cameron

Korti

- Cpt. William Henry Gordon, who was also a correspondent to The Manchester Guardian, died of thirst while traveling in the desert, near Korti, after he went missing 16 January 1885.

Metammeh: A battle at Metammeh occurred after the British had established a base at Korti and after the Battle of Abu Klea. Two were killed while other war correspondents escaped death but were injured in the same attack, including Bennet Burleigh, Harry Pearse, and Frederic Villiers.

- St. Leger Herbert (or St. Leger Algernon Herbert) (born 16 August 1850 – 19 January 1885), The Morning Post, the Canadian-born journalist was killed in a battle at Metammeh while covering the military actions of Major General Herbert Stewart, who himself was wounded on the same day. Two days earlier had reported on the deadly Battle of Abu Klea. Herbert was a military veteran and had been previously decorated for his service at the Battle of Tel el-Kebir, Egypt, in 1882.
- John Alexander Cameron, Standard, killed 19 January 1885 along with St. Leger Herbert. Cameron was also an experienced war correspondent who had reported on the Battle of Majuba Hill during the First Boer War (1880–1881).

Suakin

- Frank J.L. Roberts (Frank John Roberts), Reuters, killed at Suakin, 15 May 1885. Roberts was the first Reuters journalist to be killed while reporting.

== 1898 ==
- Hubert Howard, a war correspondent for The Times, was killed during the Battle of Omdurman on 2 September. He was killed by a shell from a gunboat that narrowly missed Herbert Kitchener, who was commander of British forces during the battle.

== St Paul's Cathedral ==
A ceremony was held 10 June 1888 at St Paul's Cathedral to commemorate the journalists killed during the 3 years of campaigns in Sudan and the dedication of a brass tablet, designed by Herbert Johnson listing seven journalists.
