= Edmund O'Donovan =

Irish war correspondent

Edmund O'Donovan (13 September 1844 – 5 November 1883), Irish war correspondent, was born in Dublin. In 1866 he began to contribute to The Irish Times and other Dublin papers. He was the first journalist killed in the Kordofan area during the Sudan campaigns while reporting for The Daily News.

== Early life ==
Edmund O'Donovan was born on the 12th of September 1844 at Bay View Avenue, Dublin. He was the son of John O'Donovan, a well known scholar and topographer from Kilkenny. O'Donovan studied medicine and free-lance journalism at Trinity College Dublin.

As teenagers, O'Donovan and most of his brothers joined the Irish Republican Brotherhood (IRB), a secret society established to achieve Irish independence. He was arrested three times and detained for some months. He was subsequently an active IRB organiser in the north of England, while turning to journalism as a career. His sense of enjoyment and pranks was pronounced. He delighted in adventures and was a skilled linguist, as well as a weapons expert. O'Donovan remained on excellent terms with Irish revolutionaries throughout his life.

== Newspaper career ==
He began his newspaper career with The Irish Times in 1866. After the Battle of Sedan, fought on 1 September 1870 during the Franco-Prussian War, O'Donovan joined the Foreign Legion of the French Army, and was wounded and taken prisoner by the Germans. In 1873, the Carlist rising attracted him to Spain, and he wrote many newspaper letters on the campaign.

From 1876 O'Donovan represented the Daily News during the rising of Bosnia and Herzegovina against the Turks, and in 1879, for the same paper, made his adventurous and famously hazardous journey to Merv. On arrival at Merv, the Turcomans, suspecting him of espionage for the Russians, detained him. The British officer and spy, Lieutenant Colonel C.E. Stewart, who was posing as an Armenian horse trader, expressed surprise that the journalist should be so intrepid, but O'Donovan had told him he was determined to record General Skobelev's troop movements in southern Transcaspia when staying at Mahometabad for weeks. But O'Donovan resolutely decided on watching the Turcomans' stronghold of Geok Tepe, when the Russian advance began. He had negotiated for safe passage when he fell ill, fearing the worst from Persian obstruction. Astutely, O'Donovan refused to reveal Stewart's secret identity to the paper, but events were subsequently released in a book on The Merv Oasis as well as a report to the Royal Geographical Society. In 1881 he was released to greet the Turcomans at Geok Tepe, who were under the impression he was there to assist them.

The Turcoman garrison was about 10,000 soldiers and 40,000 civilians. On the other side the Russian general could call on 7,000 men. The Turcomans fought fiercely to defend the fortress, while Skobelev used mortars to shell it. The Turcomans were overwhelmed when the Russians breached the walls with explosives and swarmed into the fortress. Bloody slaughter ensued, later justified by Skobelev as necessary to control the enemy. Stewart disappeared from Mahometabad, and reported to the British Mission in Tehran. O'Donovan had witnessed the whole incident from a vantage point out of harm's way high in the hills overlooking the city. Viceroy Lord Curzon later wrote:

I do not think that any sight could have impressed me more profoundly with the completeness of Russian conquest than the spectacle of these men, only eight years ago the bitter and determined enemies of Russia...

What O'Donovan had witnessed was the end of Turcoman independence.

London was deeply concerned that the Russians would march on Merv, which was a natural gateway to Afghanistan and Herat. St. Petersburg, having dismissed General Skobelev, renounced all claim to Merv when the Tsar himself approached Lord Dufferin, the British ambassador. The consequence was to switch the city from Russian allied hands, Persia, to the Turcomans; the Cossacks continued to accompany the Turcomans to Merv for trade, where in the meantime, the story ran that O'Donovan had been installed by the local chieftains as The Supreme Ruler. When they discovered his newspapers were not bank notes, he fled for his life to Tehran, from what he described as "a city of hovels".

It was only after several months' captivity that O'Donovan managed to get a message through to his principals in Persia, whence it was telegraphed to England. The adventures were described in The Merv Oasis published in 1882. The following year O'Donovan, still in search of adventure, accompanied the ill-fated expedition of Hicks Pasha to Turco-Egyptian Sudan; he perished along with most of the Anglo-Egyptian expeditionary force at the Battle of El Obeid.

== Memorial ==
O'Donovan is listed as one of seven journalists on a war memorial in St Paul's Cathedral in London for journalists who were killed during the Mahdist War between 1883 and 1885.

== See also ==
- List of journalists killed during the Sudan Campaign
