= St Leger Algernon Herbert =

English war correspondent

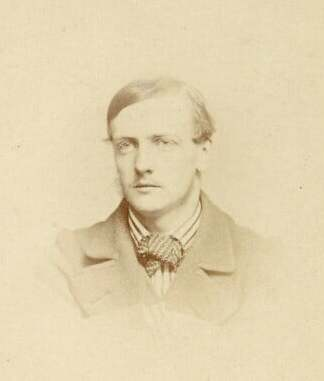
- Born: 16 August 1850; Kingston, Province of Canada
- Died: 19 January 1885 (aged 34); Khartoum, Sudan
- Occupation: War correspondent

St Leger Algernon Herbert (16 August 1850 – 19 January 1885) was an English war correspondent.

== Biography ==
Herbert was the son of Frederick Charles Herbert, commander R.N. (grandson of Henry Herbert, first earl of Carnarvon), who married, at Glanmire, County Cork, Bessie Newenham Stuart, daughter of the late Captain Henry Stuart of the 69th regiment. He was born at Kingston, Canada, 16 August 1850, and received his early education at the Royal Naval School, New Cross, Kent. He was scholar of Wadham College, Oxford, from 1869 to 1874. From 1875 to 1878 he was in the Canadian civil service, and occasionally served as private secretary to Lord Dufferin, the governor-general. Herbert acted as private secretary to Sir Garnet Wolseley during the annexation of Cyprus in 1878, and when Sir Garnet was high commissioner in South Africa. He was attached to Ferreira's horse at the storming of Sekokoeni's Mountain, and for his services was made a C.M.G. While in Cyprus and South Africa he acted as correspondent for The Times, and on returning to England was employed during the autumn and winter of 1880 in writing leading articles for that paper. In February 1881 Herbert went to Africa as secretary to Sir Frederick Roberts, and on that general's immediate return he was appointed in the same capacity to the Transvaal commission. From September to December 1883, and from February to June 1884 he served in Egypt as special correspondent of The Morning Post. He was present at the battles of El Teb and Tamai, and was shot through the leg, above the knee, at the latter engagement. In September 1884 Herbert returned to Egypt, and was attached to the staff of General Sir Herbert Stewart, K.C.B., in the expedition to Khartoum for the relief of Charles George Gordon. He escaped, unwounded, at Abu Klea, but was killed at the battle of Gubat, near Metammeh, in the Sudan, 19 January 1885. He wrote on a variety of subjects in many papers and magazines. A monument has been placed in the crypt of St. Paul's to the memory of Herbert, John Alexander Cameron and the other war correspondents who died during the Soudanese campaigns.

His brother, Allen Herbert, was a cricketer.

== See also ==
- List of journalists killed during the Mahdist War
