= Frank Vizetelly =

British journalist

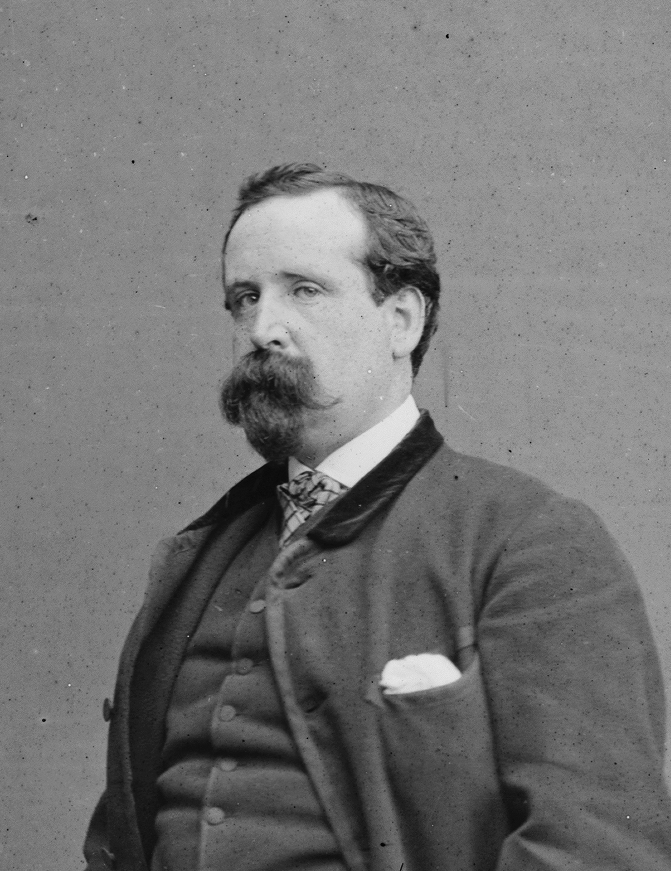
Frank Vizetelly

Frank Vizetelly (26 September 1830 – disappeared 5 November 1883) was a British journalist who reported in several parts of the world. He was presumed killed in Sudan during the Battle of Shaykan.

== Biography ==
Frank was the son of James Henry Vizetelly (1790–1838), who founded a firm of Vizetelly & Company known for publishing George Cruikshank's Comic Almanack, and younger brother of James and Henry Vizetelly, both active in journalism and publishing. He was born in London, educated in Boulogne, and went to Paris in 1857.

There, he was an early editor of the French weekly newspaper Le Monde illustré. From 1859, he was employed as a war correspondent and artist by The Illustrated London News, founded by his elder brother, Henry. He travelled to Italy, Spain, and America, where he reported from both sides of the Civil War, and Egypt.

He disappeared, presumed killed, during the massacre of Hicks Pasha's army in Sudan.
