= Frederic Villiers =

British artist

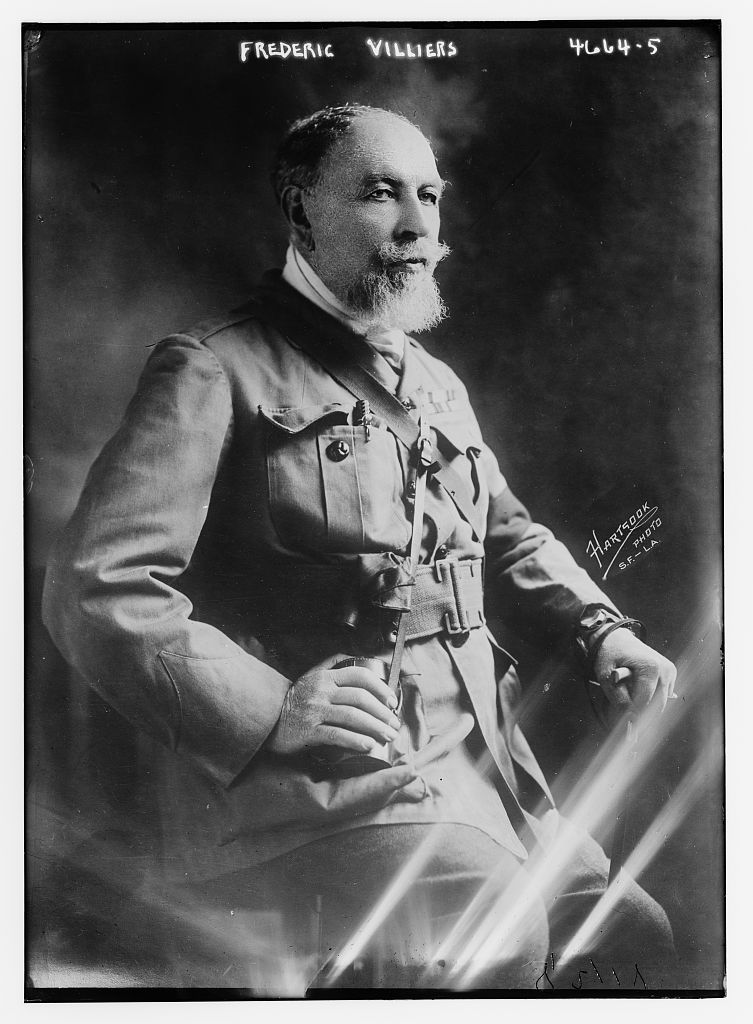
- Born: 23 April 1851; London, England
- Died: 5 April 1922 (aged 70); London, England
- Occupations: War artist, war correspondent

Frederic Villiers (23 April 1851 – 5 April 1922) was a British war artist and war correspondent. Along with William Simpson and Melton Prior, Villiers was one of the most notable 'special' artists of the later 19th century. He may have been the model for the Kipling war-artist character, Dick Heldar in The Light that Failed.

== Biography ==
Born in London, England on 23 April 1851, Villiers was educated in France at Guînes situated in the Pas-de-Calais. Between 1869 and 1870, he was an art student at the British Museum and in South Kensington, and in the following year at the Royal Academy Schools. In 1876 while walking down Holborn, he noticed a crowd reading a poster of an evening paper stating that Serbia had declared war on Turkey. He immediately decided to contact the paper, The Graphic, offering his services as a war artist. The paper took him up on his offer and it was the beginning of a long career covering wars and conflicts around the globe.

Having reported on the Russo-Turkish War in 1877 and witnessed the events at the Battle of Plevna, he traveled to Afghanistan to cover the Second Afghan War that had broken out in 1878. Here he befriended Pierre Louis Napoleon Cavagnari who gave the artist the pens that were used to sign the Treaty of Gandamak. A world cruise followed in which he visited British India where he dined with the Viceroy, Lord Lytton at Simla, travelling on to Sydney, Tasmania, Auckland, Honolulu and San Francisco, and in 1882 was in Egypt to cover the Anglo-Egyptian War; he was present at Battle of Tel-el-Kebir. In July 1882 he was a guest alongside rival journalist Moberly Bell on board HMS Condor when its commander Lord Charles Beresford attacked Fort Marabut during the Bombardment of Alexandria.

The following year saw him in Russia to cover the coronation of Tsar Alexander III but he was soon back in North Africa, this time to provide sketches of the fighting in the Sudan during the Gordon relief expedition. He covered the Serbo-Bulgarian War in 1886, the Third Anglo-Burmese War of 1887, the First Sino-Japanese War of 1894–95, and the Greco-Turkish War of 1897.

In 1898, he was one of the artists sent to cover the campaign in Sudan which culminated at Battle of Omdurman. Villiers brought along an early cine-camera and was filming when an explosion caused the boat to rock in the Nile River, tipping over the apparatus. His other campaigns included the Boer War where he accompanied the Kimberley Relief Column.

During the Russo-Japanese War, Villiers was embedded with Japanese troops at the Battle of Port Arthur as a reporter for The Illustrated London News. Few other illustrators or cameramen were willing to approach the front lines as closely as Villiers, and many of his sketches were published in various newspapers and books during and after the war. However, during First World War, Villiers was particularly frustrated during the opening months for not being allowed to go near the front

Villiers worked primarily for The Graphic but also supplied illustrations to Black and White as well as serving as a special correspondent of The Standard; he also contributed illustrations to the English Illustrated Magazine and The Idler. He counted among his friends, Archibald Forbes and John Alexander Cameron, who was killed in the Gordon Relief Expedition; he was also a friend of the Prince of Wales and was invited on at least one occasion to go hunting with the Prince in Scotland. Villiers exhibited two paintings at the Royal Academy, the first in 1882 entitled 'The road home; the return of an Imperial brigade from Afghanistan', and in the following year 'Fighting Arabi with his own weapons; an incident of the Battle of Tel el-Kebir'.

He was awarded twelve medals and war decorations over his career, including awards from Russia, Romania, the Egyptian Khedive's Star, and the Serbian Order of Takova.

Villiers gave frequent illustrated lectures and published several autobiographical works describing his experiences at the front.

He died on 5 April 1922.

== Bibliography ==
- Villiers, Frederic (March 1895). "The Truth about Port Arthur". North American Review. 160 (460): 325–330. JSTOR 25103490.
- "My recent journey from the Nile to Suakim," Journal of the Society of Arts, 4 February 1898, pp. 233–240.
- Pictures of Many Wars (1902)
- Port Arthur, three months with the besiegers; a diurnal of occurrents. London and New York: Longmans, Green and Co. 1905 – via Internet Archive.
- Peaceful Personalities and Warriors Bold. London and New York: Harper & Brothers. 1907 – via Internet Archive.
- Days of glory; the sketch book of a veteran correspondent at the front; with an introduction by Philip Gibbs. New York: George H. Doran. 1920 – via Internet Archive.
- Villiers: His Five Decades of Adventure. Vol. 1. New York and London: Harper & Brothers. 1920 – via Internet Archive.; Villiers: His Five Decades of Adventure. Vol. 2. New York and London: Harper & Brothers. 1920 – via Internet Archive.
