= Alan Herbert =

Alan or Allen Herbert may refer to:

- A. P. Herbert, British Member of Parliament and writer
- Alan Herbert (Canadian politician), Canadian politician and activist
- Alan Herbert, presenter of the Captain Fortune Show
- Allen Herbert; see List of Middlesex CCC first-class cricketers
