= Henry Vizetelly =

British publisher and writer (1820–1894)

Henry Richard Vizetelly
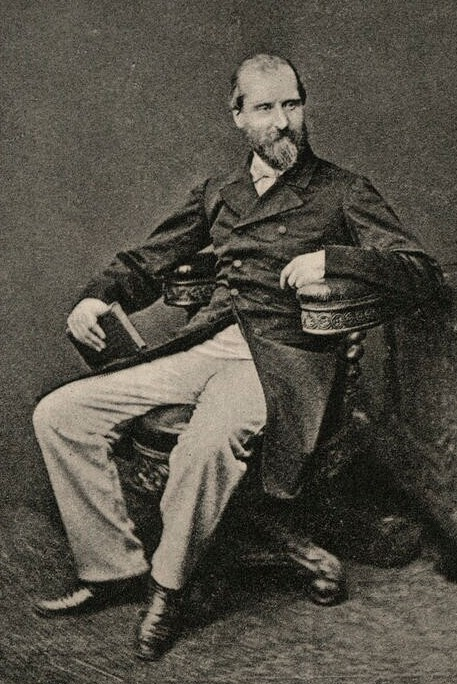
- A photograph of Vizetelly in 1863
- Born: 30 July 1820
- Died: 1 January 1894 (aged 73)
- Occupations: Publisher & writer

Henry Richard Vizetelly (30 July 1820 – 1 January 1894) was a British publisher and writer. He started the publications Pictorial Times and Illustrated Times, wrote several books while working in Paris and Berlin as correspondent for The Illustrated London News, and between 1880 and 1890, ran a publishing house in London, Vizetelly & Company.

== Life and career ==
Vizetelly was born in London, the son of a printer. He was early apprenticed as a wood-engraver, and one of his first woodblocks was a portrait of Old Parr. He said he was in San Francisco, California, when gold was discovered in 1849 and his book California (written under the pseudonym "J. Tyrwhitt Brooks") recounts adventures for four months in the gold fields. In his 1893 autobiography, Glances Back Through Seventy Years, he admits it was a hoax, as he had never left London and wrote the book in just a few weeks.

In 1843, encouraged by the success of The Illustrated London News, Vizetelly, with his brother James Thomas Vizetelly (1817–1897) and Andrew Spottiswoode (1787–1866), started the Pictorial Times, which was published successfully for several years. In 1855, in partnership with the bookseller David Bogue (1812–1856), he started a three-penny paper called the Illustrated Times, which four years later was merged in the Penny Illustrated Paper. His other brother, Frank Vizetelly (1830–1883) was a war artist for both sides during the American Civil War and went to Egypt as war correspondent for The Illustrated London News. He was never heard of after the massacre of Hicks Pasha's army in Kordofan.

In 1865, Vizetelly became the Paris correspondent for The Illustrated London News. During the years he remained in Paris, he published several books: Paris in Peril (1882), The Story of the Diamond Necklace (1867) and a free translation of Marius Topin's L'homme au masque de fer (1870) under the title The Man in the Iron Mask.

In 1872, Vizetelly was transferred to Berlin, where he wrote Berlin under the New Empire (1879).

In 1880, Vizetelly established a publishing house in London, Vizetelly & Company. They issued numerous translations of French and Russian authors, such as the first English translation of Flaubert's Madame Bovary, written by Eleanor Marx in 1886. In 1887, they launched the Mermaid Series of reprints of English Elizabethan, Jacobean and Restoration drama, and in 1888 he was prosecuted for obscene libel for publishing the translation of Zola's La Terre (The Soil), and was fined £100. When he continued to sell Zola's works in 1889, he was once more charged, given a £200 fine, and sentenced to three months in jail. As a result, Vizetelly & Co. filed for bankruptcy by the end of 1890.

In 1893, Vizetelly wrote a volume of autobiographical reminiscence called Glances Back through Seventy Years, a graphic picture of literary Bohemia in Paris and London between 1840 and 1870. He died on 1 January 1894 at "Heatherlands", Tilford, near Farnham in Surrey.

Vizetelly's interest in wines led to the creation of several books. The Wines of the World Characterized & Classed: with some particulars respecting the beers of Europe was published in 1875 and Facts About Champagne and Other Sparkling Wines Collected During Numerous Visits to the Champagne and Other Viticultural Districts of France, and the Principal Remaining Wine-Producing Countries of Europe was published in 1879. He was Wine Juror for Great Britain at the Vienna and Paris Exhibitions of 1873 and 1878. In 1882 he wrote A History of Champagne: with notes on the other sparkling wines of France.

He had four sons by his first wife, notably Ernest Alfred Vizetelly (1853–1922) who edited and had republished some of the Zola translations previously published by his father. His other son Edward translated Zola's La Bête humaine in 1901 as The Monomaniac. By his second wife, Elizabeth Anne Ansell, he had a daughter and a son, Frank Horace Vizetelly (1864–1938), who was a lexicographer, etymologist and editor.

Vizetelly was appointed knight of the Order of Franz Joseph.

== Book series ==
Vizetelly published 21 series between 1880 and 1890 and further series as early as 1852:

- Du Boisgobey's Sensational Novels
- Boulevard Novels
- Celebrated Russian Novels
- Cream of the Diarists and Memoir Writers
- Eighteenth-Century Illustrated Books
- French Sensational Novels (AKA Celebrated Sensational Novels)
- Gaboriau's Sensational Novels
- Grenville-Murray
- Henry Vizetelly's Books
- The Mermaid Series
- Miscellaneous Shilling books
- Moore's Realistic Novels
- People who have Made a Noise in the World
- Popular French Novels
- Readable Books
- Sala
- Sensational Stories
- Sixpenny Series of Amusing and Entertaining Books (AKA Vizetelly's Amusing Books)
- The Social Zoo
- Vizetelly's Half-Crown Series
- Vizetelly's One-Volume Novels
- Zola's Realistic Novels
