= Allen Herbert =

English cricketer

Personal information
- Full name: Allen Henry William Herbert
- Born: 20 October 1852; Dartford, Kent
- Died: 14 September 1897 (aged 44); Belgravia, London
- Batting: Right-handed
- Role: Batsman

Domestic team information
- Years: Team
- 1872–1876: Marylebone Cricket Club (MCC)
- 1874: Kent
- 1875: Middlesex
- FC debut: 29 July 1872 MCC v Surrey
- Last FC: 12 June 1876 MCC v Nottinghamshire

Career statistics
| Competition | First-class |
|---|---|
| Matches | 11 |
| Runs scored | 239 |
| Batting average | 14.05 |
| 100s/50s | 0/1 |
| Top score | 63 |
| Catches/stumpings | 6/– |
- Source: ESPNcricinfo, 6 June 2022

Allen Henry William Herbert (20 October 1852 – 14 September 1897) was an English cricketer during the 1870s.

Herbert was born at Dartford in Kent in 1852, the son of Frederick and Bessie Newenham Herbert (née Stuart). His father was a Commander in the Royal Navy and Herbert was educated at the Royal Naval School at New Cross. His father died in 1868 and by the 1871 census he was living with his widowed mother at Saffron Walden in Essex.

All 11 of Herbert's first-class cricket matches were played between 1872 and 1876. He played eight times in first-class matches for Marylebone Cricket Club (MCC), making his first-class debut for the club in 1872, scoring a half-century against Surrey. This proved to be the only time he passed 50 runs in a first-class match; he scored a total of 239 runs at a batting average of 14.09 runs per innings. He made one appearance each for Kent and Middlesex, and another for the Gentlemen of the South. In minor cricket, he played once for Essex in 1872, and regularly for MCC during that period, scoring a century against the Royal Artillery in 1875 at Lord's.

By 1881, Herbert was working as a clerk at Hoare's Bank, and lived in Belgravia in London. His elder brother, St Leger Herbert, was a soldier and journalist who died during the Mahdist War in 1885 in Mahdist Sudan. Herbert himself died in Belgravia in 1897 aged 44.

== Bibliography ==
- Carlaw, Derek (2020). Kent County Cricketers, A to Z: Part One (1806–1914) (PDF). Cardiff: ACS.
