= Battle of Shaykan =

1883 battle of the Mahdist War

Coordinates: 13.1833°N 30.2167°E

- Part of the Mahdist War
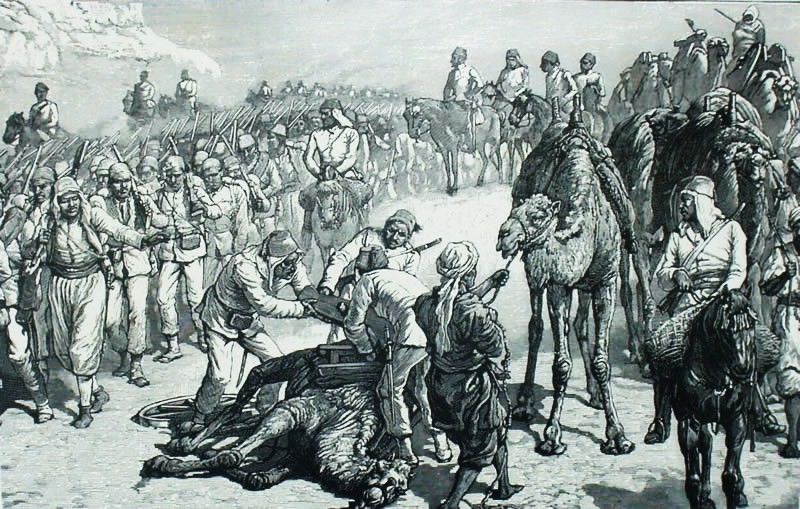
- An illustration of Hicks Pasha's army marching to the battle
Date	3–5 November 1883
Location	Near Kashgil, Kordofan
Result	Mahdist victory

Belligerents
Mahdist State	Egypt

Commanders and leaders
Muhammad Ahmad	Hicks Pasha †

Strength
~40,000 irregulars	~8,000 infantry ~1,000 cavalry ~100 irregulars 14 cannon 6 machine guns

Casualties and losses
~280 killed ~600 injured	~7,000 killed ~2,000 captured

The Battle of Shaykan was fought between Egyptian forces under the command of Hicks Pasha and the forces of Muhammad Ahmad, the self-proclaimed Mahdi, in the woods of Shaykan near Kashgil near the town of El Obeid during 3–5 November 1883.

== Background ==
After the Mahdi retreated into Kordofan in 1881 he started to raise an army there and in Darfur. A force of 4,000 was sent to capture him, but it was ambushed near El Obeid and destroyed, and all of its equipment captured. The Mahdi's forces had grown spectacularly, and by 1883 British sources placed their size at 200,000, although that was almost certainly an overestimate.

The Egyptian Governor, Rauf Pasha, decided that the only solution to the growing rebellion was a fight, and against the advice of his British advisors started to raise an army of his own. He hired a number of European officers to lead his force, placing them under the command of William "Billy" Hicks, a retired colonel who had experience in India and Abyssinia. Hicks' force was composed mostly of Egyptian soldiers who had been imprisoned after fighting in the Urabi Revolt. They were released for service in Sudan and accordingly showed little inclination to fight. They initially stayed near Khartoum and met small portions of the Mahdist forces on April 29, near the fort of Kawa, on the Nile, fending them off with little issue. Similar skirmishes followed over the next few weeks.

Later during the summer of 1883 they heard that the Mahdi himself was besieging El Obeid, a small town set up by the Egyptians some years earlier and now the capital of Kordofan. The Egyptian officials decided to capture him and, despite Hicks' reluctance, planned an expedition from their current location at Duem on the Nile to El Obeid, about 200 miles away.

== Battle ==
The Kordofan expedition was made up of about 8,000 Egyptian regulars, 1,000 bashi-bazouk cavalry, 100 tribal irregulars and 2,000 camp followers. They carried supplies for 50 days on an immense baggage train consisting of 5,000 camels. The army also carried some ten mountain guns, four Krupp field guns and six Nordenfeldt machine guns. Hicks' chief of staff was another Englishman, Colonel Farquhar. By the time the expedition started El Obeid had fallen, but the operation was maintained to relieve Slatin Bey, the Governor of Darfur. The force was, in the words of Winston Churchill, "perhaps the worst army that has ever marched to war". They were unpaid, untrained, undisciplined, its soldiers having more in common with their enemies than with their officers.

Either by mistake or by design, their guides led them astray, and they soon found themselves surrounded. The regulars' morale plummeted and they started to desert en masse. After marching for some time they were set upon by the entire Mahdist army on November 3. The Egyptian forces quickly formed into a defensive square. According to reports published in Britain soon after, the square held for two days before finally collapsing. About one-third of the Egyptian soldiers surrendered and were later freed, while all the officers were killed. Only about 500 Egyptian troops managed to escape and make it back to Khartoum. Neither Hicks nor any of his senior officers was among them. Among the non-combatants killed were Edmund O'Donovan of The Daily News and Frank Vizetelly of The Graphic.

After the battle the Mahdist army made El Obeid a centre for operations for some time. Their success also emboldened Osman Digna, whose Hadendoa tribesmen, the so-called fuzzy-wuzzies, joined the rebellion from their lands on the Red Sea coast.

== See also ==
- Henry Vizetelly
