= William Simpson (Scottish artist) =

British war artist (1823–1899)

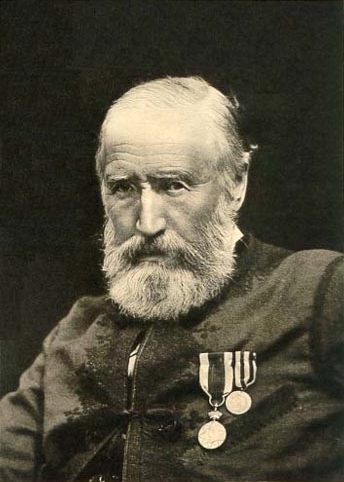
- Simpson in 1864
- Born: 28 October 1823; Glasgow, Scotland
- Died: 17 August 1899 (aged 75); Willesden, England
- Known for: War artist
- Notable work: The Seat of the War in the East
- Partner: Maria Eliza Burt
- Children: Penelope Simpson

William Simpson (28 October 1823 – 17 August 1899) was a British artist, war artist and war correspondent.

Born into poverty in Glasgow, Simpson went on to become one of the leading 'special artists' of his day, and sketched many scenes of war, culture and architecture around the world, for the Illustrated London News. Besides his war pictures, he covered state events, coronations, funerals, and other ceremonies. He was a noted ethnographer and antiquarian, and wrote extensively on ancient religions, customs, and ancient artifacts.

== Early life ==
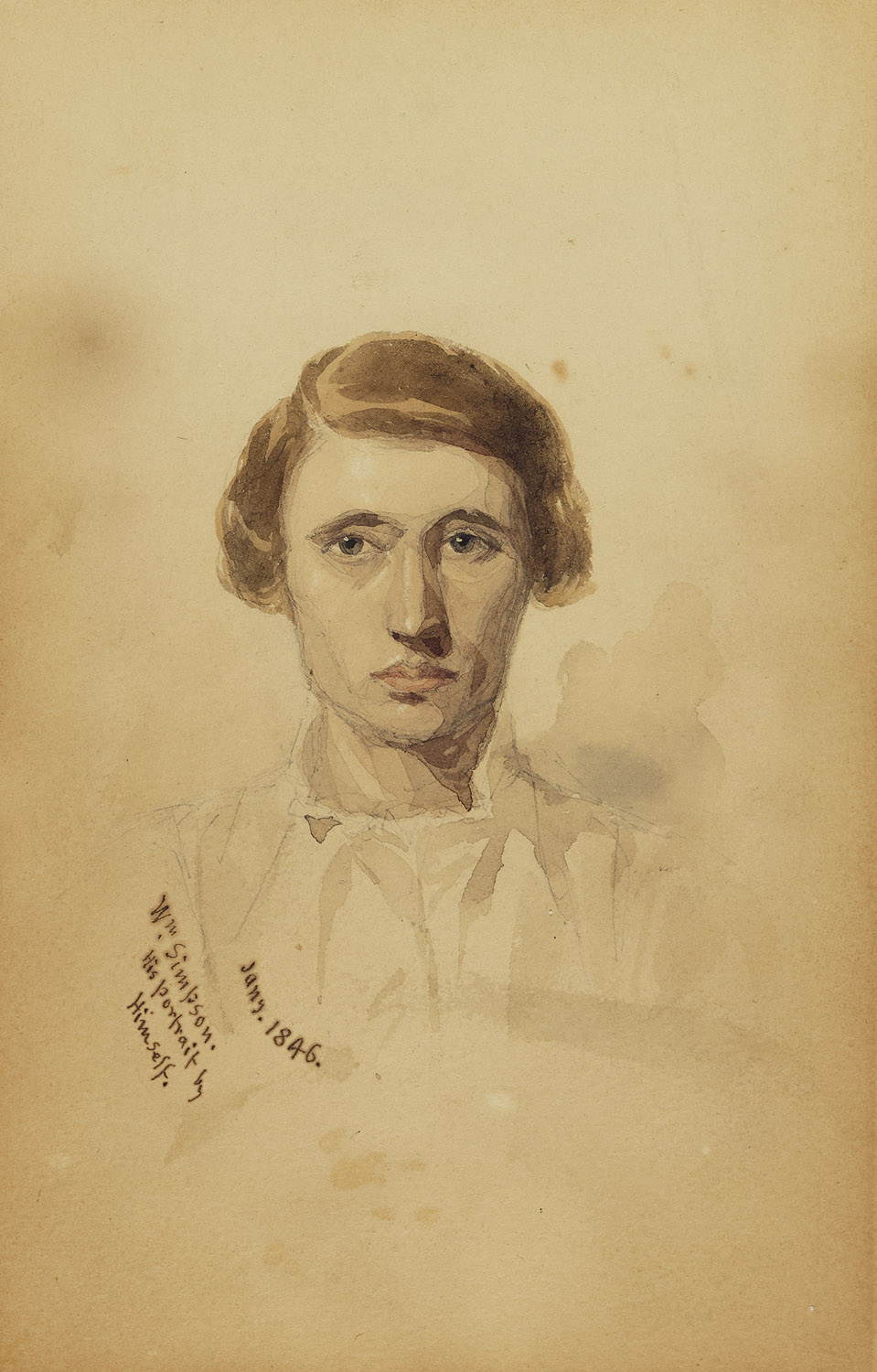
Self portrait, 1846

His early years were difficult, living in a house with an abusive and alcoholic father, shipyard labourer James Simpson, and his mother, Ann Johnstone. He was born in Carrick Street near the River Clyde, and for a time, the family lived at Orbiston, an Owenite utopian community in Bellshill. Returning to Glasgow, they moved into a tenement in North Frederick Street. In 1834 he was sent to live with his grandmother in Perth. Simpson's only formal schooling, at a writing school, took place during this fifteen month period and by the age of fourteen, he was working as an apprentice in the Glasgow lithographic firm of Macfarlane.

He was then indentured for seven years as an apprentice to Allan and Ferguson, another lithographer. In his time off he practiced sketching from nature, going for walks in the countryside. He attended the Andersonian University, Glasgow Mechanics' institute & Gorbals Popular Institution in the evenings, hearing lectures on science, natural philosophy and engineering, and conducting experiments. These educational establishments provided lectures, practical instruction and access to libraries for working class men.

In 1845, the Government School of Design opened in Ingram Street. Simpson joined and attended in the evenings for several years. After 13 years with Allan & Ferguson, he left Glasgow for London in 1851, and got a job with Lithographers Day & Son.

== Crimean War ==
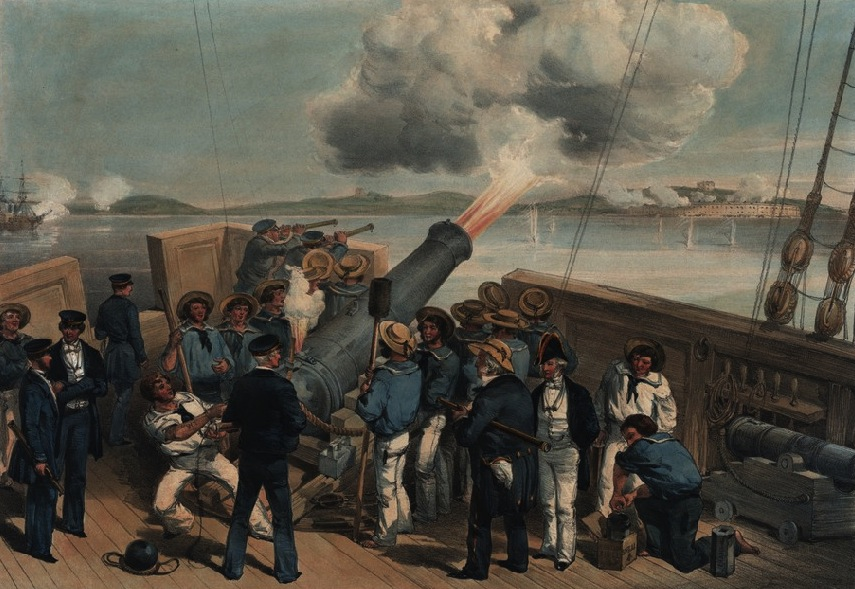
Bombardment of Bomarsund during the Åland War; lithograph from The Seat of the War in the East

After the outbreak of the Crimean War in 1854, he was given the task of creating an image of the Alma based on various accounts so that it could be lithographed by another London publisher, Lloyd's. He also put sketches sent from the Baltic onto stone for the firm of Colnaghi. In anticipation of the fall of Sevastopol, Lloyd's had him prepare an image of the fall of the town so that it could be published upon news of its actual capture. This presented a challenge to Simpson as he had little information about Sebastopol. He occasionally spoke with Mr. Day of Day and Son about the need to have sketches drawn at the front. Shortly thereafter, Colnaghi's contacted Simpson and invited him to go out to the Crimea and make sketches for the company.

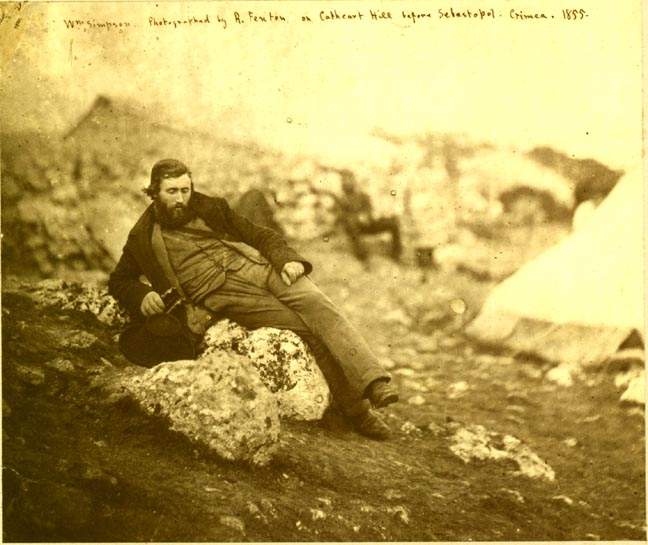
Simpson photographed by Roger Fenton on Cathecart Hill before Sevastopol, 1855

Simpson arrived off the Crimean peninsula on 15 November 1854 and could hear distant firing. While he had missed the early battles, he was able to record the events before Sevastopol. He made numerous acquaintances who helped him with details for his pictures, but he was also struck by the plight of the common soldiers, "miserable looking beings...covered with mud, dirt, and rags," he wrote. He socialised with many officers, including Lord Raglan and Captain Peel; he also met Roger Fenton who took his photograph. In May 1855, Simpson accompanied Raglan on the expedition to Kertch which was captured on the 24th, but was back in time to observe the first Siege of Sevastopol in June. On the night of the 17th, he crawled out of a trench to view the attack. He wrote, "It was a wild orchestra of sound, never to be forgotten." He was still at the front when the city surrendered, and he left the Crimea in the autumn of 1855.

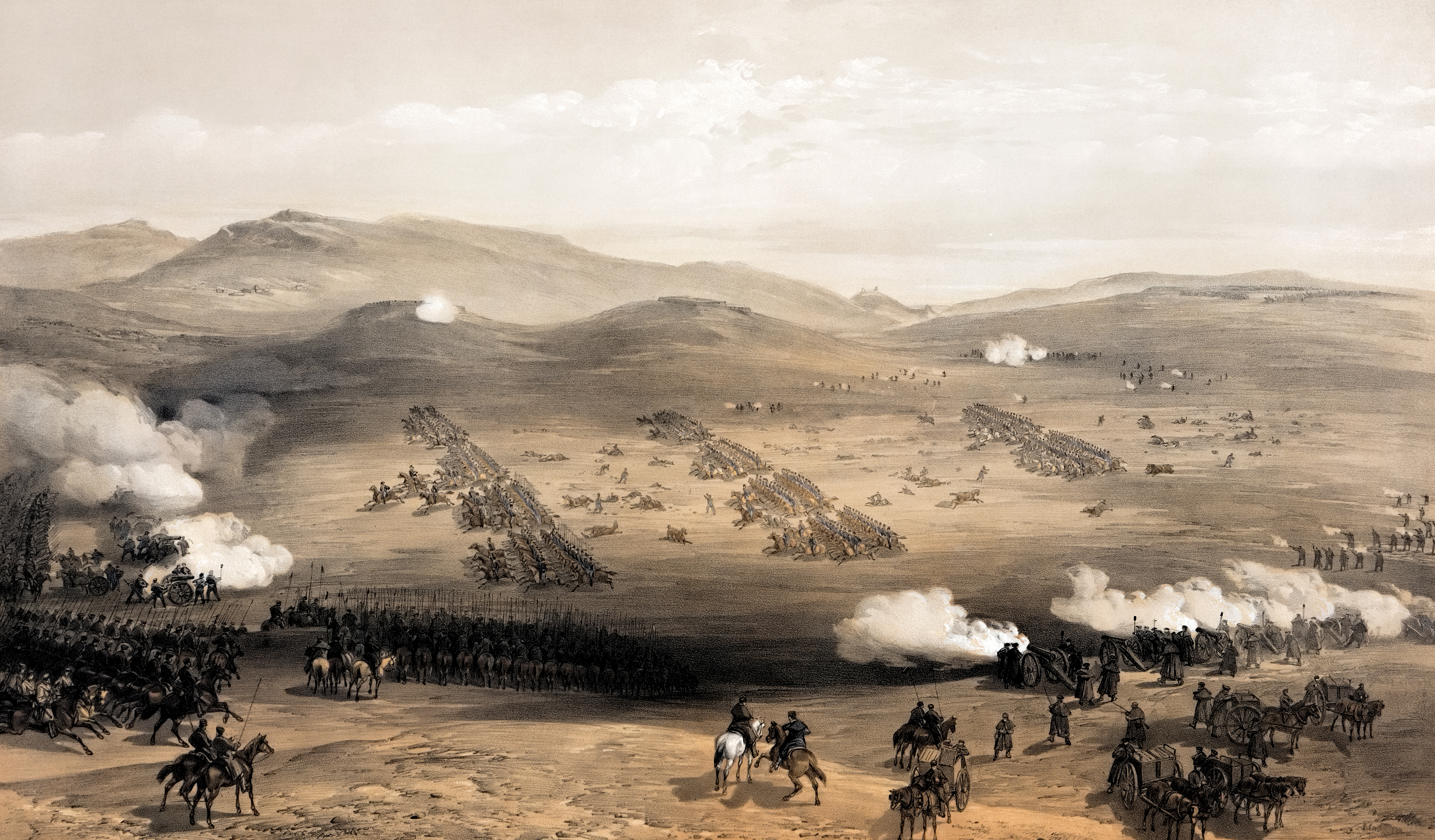
"The Charge of the Light Brigade at Balaklava," lithograph from The Seat of the War in the East

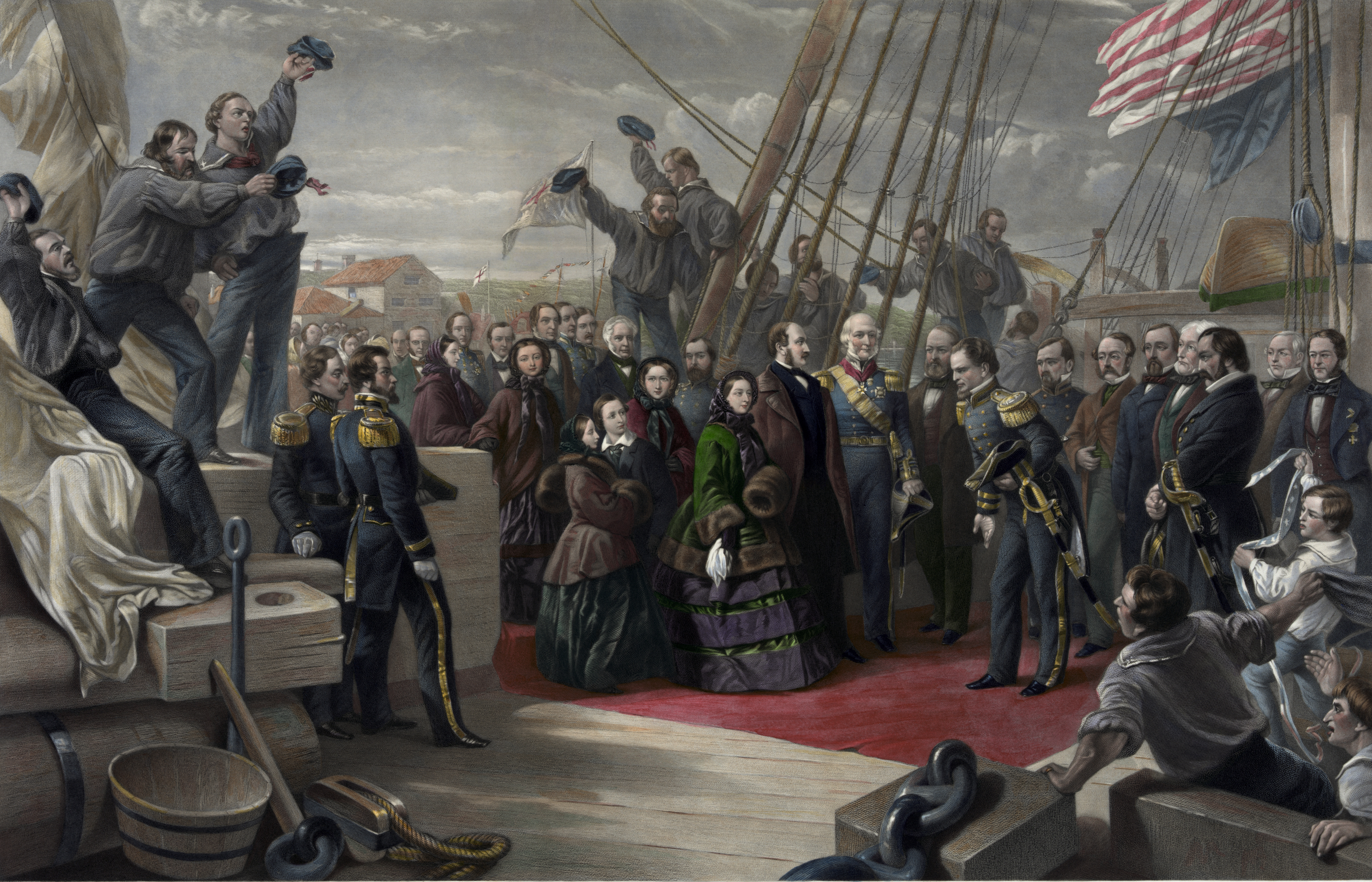
Another of his works for the Colnaghis, showing Queen Victoria, to whom the image is dedicated, visiting HMS Resolute

Throughout his time at the front, he would send back his watercolours to London where the lithographers of Day & Son would transfer them to stone. Simpson was paid 20 pounds for each picture. For the colour, a separate stone was used for each tone. Colnaghis exhibited some of the watercolours including a show at the Graphic Society in February 1855. The first advertisements for the lithographs appeared in May 1855 and in the following month, a second series was announced.

In all, the Colnaghis produced two large portfolios containing over eighty lithographs entitled The Seat of the War in the East. Two thousand copies of the complete set were produced. Simpson dedicated the series to Queen Victoria whose patronage he enjoyed for the rest of his life. He went on to be a frequent visitor to Windsor Castle and Balmoral. So popular were his pictures that he became affectionately known at 'Crimean Simpson'. There was a plan for the watercolours to be purchased for the nation but this came to nothing and they were sold off by the Colnaghi's.

== India ==
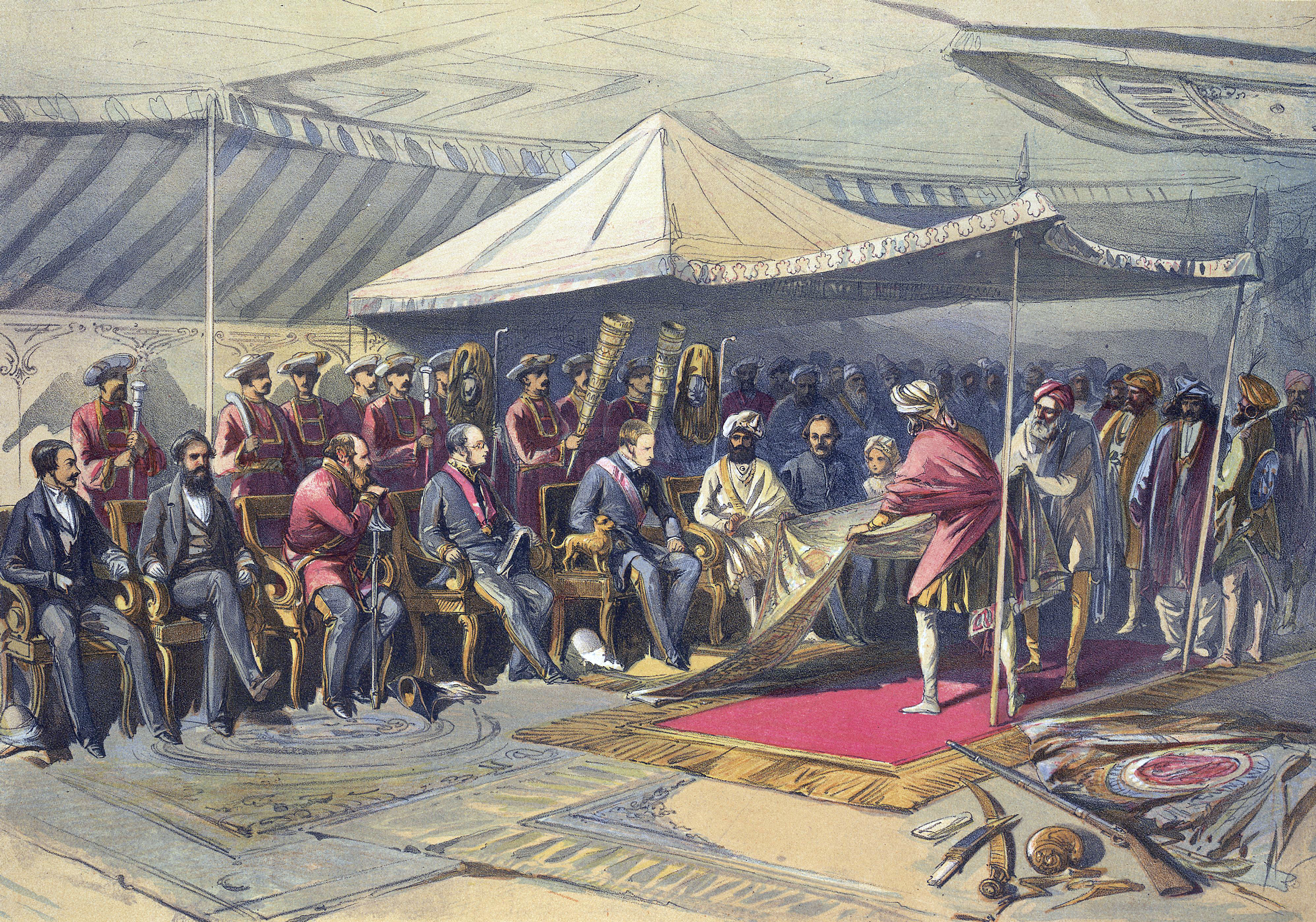
Return visit of the Viceroy to the Maharaja of Cashmere

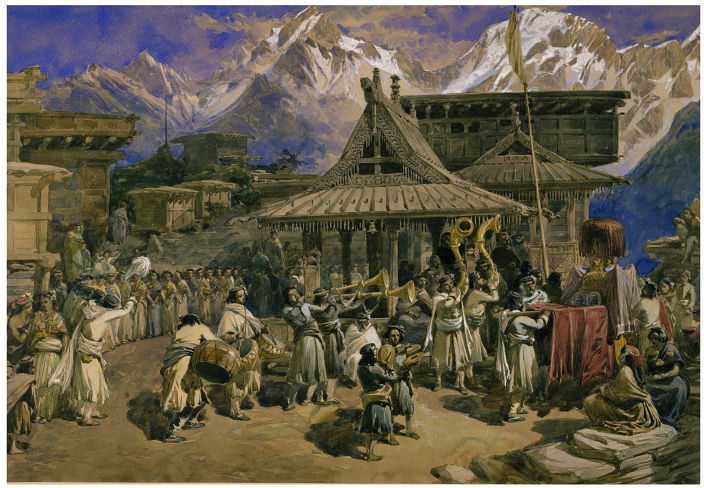
Worship of the Devi at Kothi, near Chini

In 1857, he was sent to India to sketch scenes relating to the recent Sepoy Revolt, which is also described as the Indian Rebellion of 1857. The idea was to produce an illustrated publication similar to the Crimean portfolio, and Simpson had discussed the possibility with Mr. Day. The artist arrived at Calcutta on 29 October 1859, and travelled in Punjab, Sutlej, Bengal, Lucknow and Cawnpore, central India, the Himalayas, Kashmir and Madras. In the summer of 1860, during these travels, Simpson visited Chini in the Sutlej Valley to avoid the monsoon rains, spending two months documenting local religious traditions and ceremonies. He later published these observations in Good Words and expanded upon them for the Royal Asiatic Society. In February, 1862, he left Bombay and arrived in London only to find that Day and Son could not afford to produce a portfolio. Nevertheless, a large volume of coloured lithographs was published under the title India Ancient and Modern. He was commissioned by Day & Son to visit these parts of India and record the places affected by the momentous events of the 'Mutiny' of 1857. Before leaving, he spent 'a considerable time in the library of India House, then in Leadenhall Street, looking over books about India, such as Daniels', to see what had been already done, and to get hints as to places I ought to visit'. The set of lithographs produced, based on his watercolours, was intended to rival David Roberts' The Holy Land in scope. However, the project never came to fruition, following the financial collapse of Day & Son, due to the rise of wood engraving. By 1866, Simpson had delivered 250 watercolours to Day & Son and these were subsequently sold off as bankrupt stock. Only 50 had been prepared as chromolithographs, and were published in 1867 as India Ancient and Modern. A series of illustrations of the country and people of India and adjacent territories. For Simpson this was little consolation: 'So the great work on India, on which I had bestowed so much time and labour, never came into existence...'.

== Illustrated London News ==
In 1866, Simpson was contacted by The Illustrated London News to do some sketches of the Prince of Wales, on a visit to the Duke of Sutherland at Dunrobin Castle. Afterwards, the paper asked him to go to St. Petersburg and cover the Prince of Wales's attendance at the marriage of the Czarevich, afterward Emperor Alexander III. Simpson became a “special artist”, employed by the paper to illustrate the news.

== Abyssinia ==
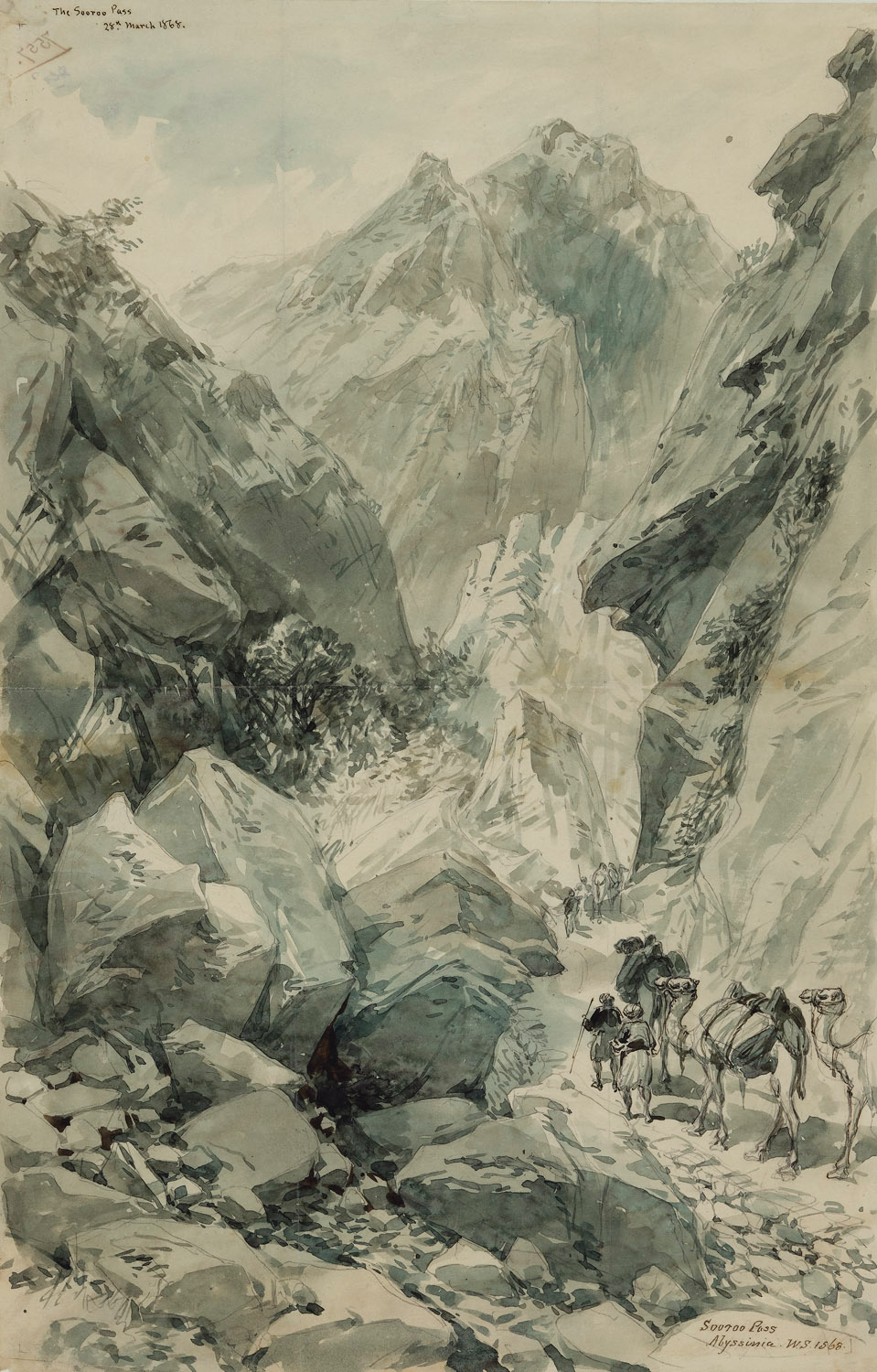
Sooroo Pass, Abyssinia by William Simpson

In 1868, Simpson travelled to Abyssinia covering the British expedition to Abyssinia. Initially, The Illustrated London News used sketches supplied by one of the soldiers on campaign, Colonel Baigrie, but as his pictures were mostly landscapes, the paper felt that Simpson could add more life to the accounts of the war. The artist arrived at Suez on 18 June 1868, but by the time he neared the front, news came that Magdala had fallen to the Anglo-Indian force. Nonetheless, he was able to observe the retreat of the Abyssinian army, and the remains of the royal quarters of Emperor Tewodros II at Magdala, which had been looted by the British Army. He arrived back at Dover on 2 July 1868 and the Illustrated London News published a special folio volume on the British expedition to Abyssinia containing many of Simpson's and Baigrie's drawings.

== Franco-Prussian War and the Paris Commune ==
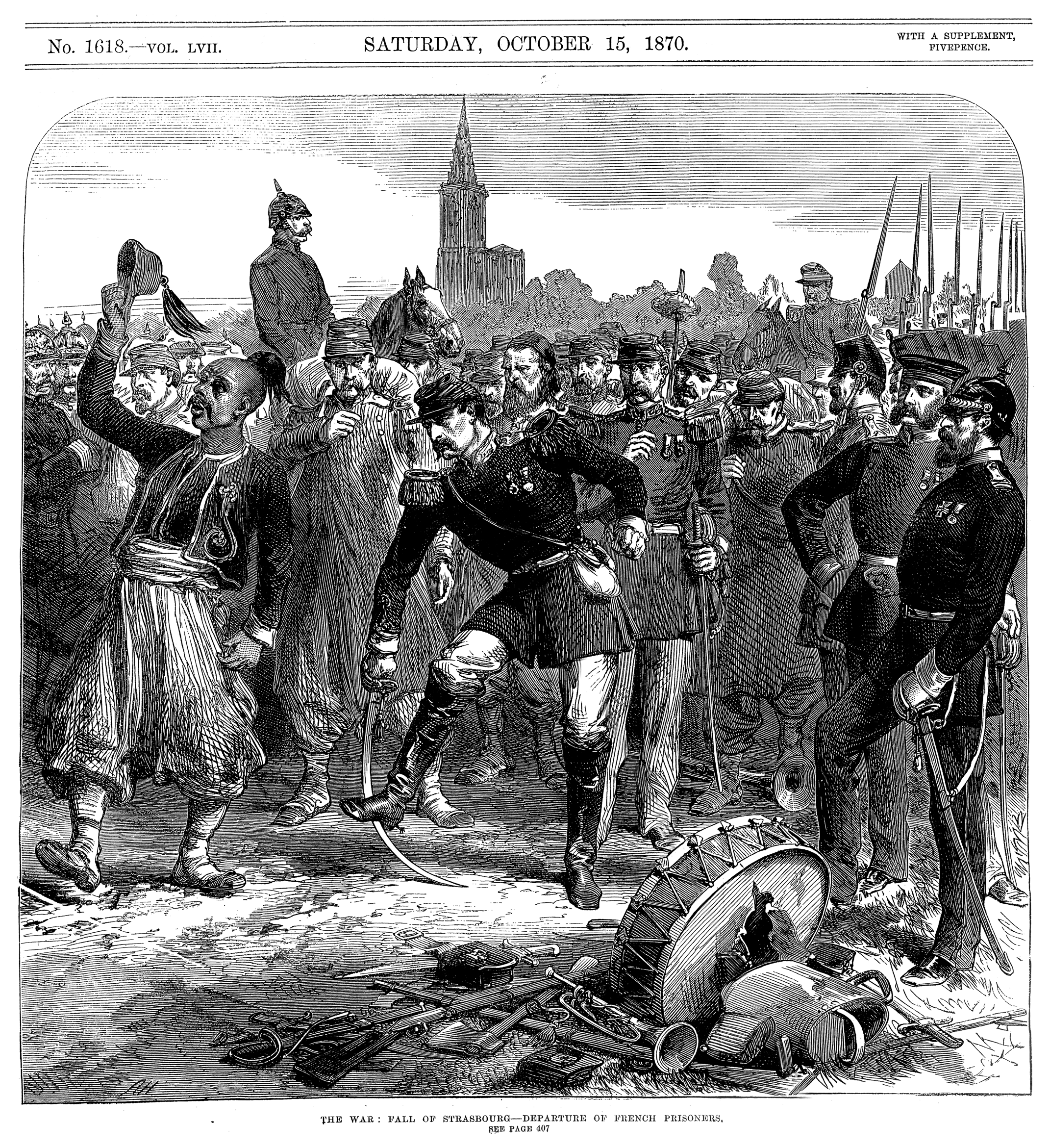
Siege of Strasbourg, 1870

In 1870, Simpson went to France to sketch the war with Prussia. On 25 July, he headed for the front by going from Nancy to Metz. In Metz, several journalists had already been arrested on suspicion of spying, and Simpson had to be careful while making his sketches. He had to be creative in getting his sketches to London, and began using cigarette papers. As he said: "One could do a great deal on a book of that kind, and in the event of being apprehended, could make a cigarette of the sketch and smoke it before the eyes of one's accusers.". In early August, he observed the arrival of the wounded after the Battle of Forbach-Spicheren. Later while sketching a coach, he was surrounded by soldiers and arrested on suspicion of being a spy but he convinced the French authorities that he was a 'special artist'. At the police station, his sketches were examined, and he was finally released.

Upon news of the surrender at Sedan, Simpson travelled to sketch the battlefield from the windows of a nearby chateau.

In November 1870, he returned to London but was back in France in April 1871 to observe the events around Paris, where he was once again suspected of spying but was allowed to go free. On 27 April, he visited Paris and spent four weeks there, sketching the fortifications and the events of the Paris Commune. He was back in London by 11 June 1871.

== Meeting the Sun ==
In 1872, William Simpson left for a long trip to Egypt, China, Japan & USA. The sketches he made were engraved for the Illustrated London News, and were reproduced using the heliotype process in a volume named Meeting the sun: a journey all round the world through Egypt, China, Japan and California, including an account of the marriage ceremonies of the emperor of China. In Beijing he sketched the Chinese Emperor's wedding festivities. In 1873, Simpson happened to be in San Francisco when, on 11 April, Kintpuash ('Captain Jack') and his Modoc followers murdered Brigadier-General Edward Canby and Methodist minister Eleazar Thomas at a peace parley. Simpson interrupted his world tour and journeyed up to Tule Lake and the lava beds at the California/Oregon border to make sketches of the Modoc War. His sketch of the Canby/Thomas assassination scene was the signature graphic representation of the 1873 Modoc War.

In 1874, he was elected an Associate of the (soon to be Royal) Institute of Painters in Water Colours. In 1875, he accompanied the Prince of Wales to India, and arrived in Mumbai on 30 October. The tour was designed to strengthen ties between Britain and India, which was then ruled by the British Crown. The Prince collected a large number of items of Indian art during the tour, which were often presented to him by various local rulers during receptions and events. William Simpson wrote about the tour in his autobiography: "I have often described the Prince's tour in India as four months of the Lord Mayor's show".

In 1877, visited Athens, Mycenae and Troy, to document the excavations of Schliemann.

== Afghan War ==
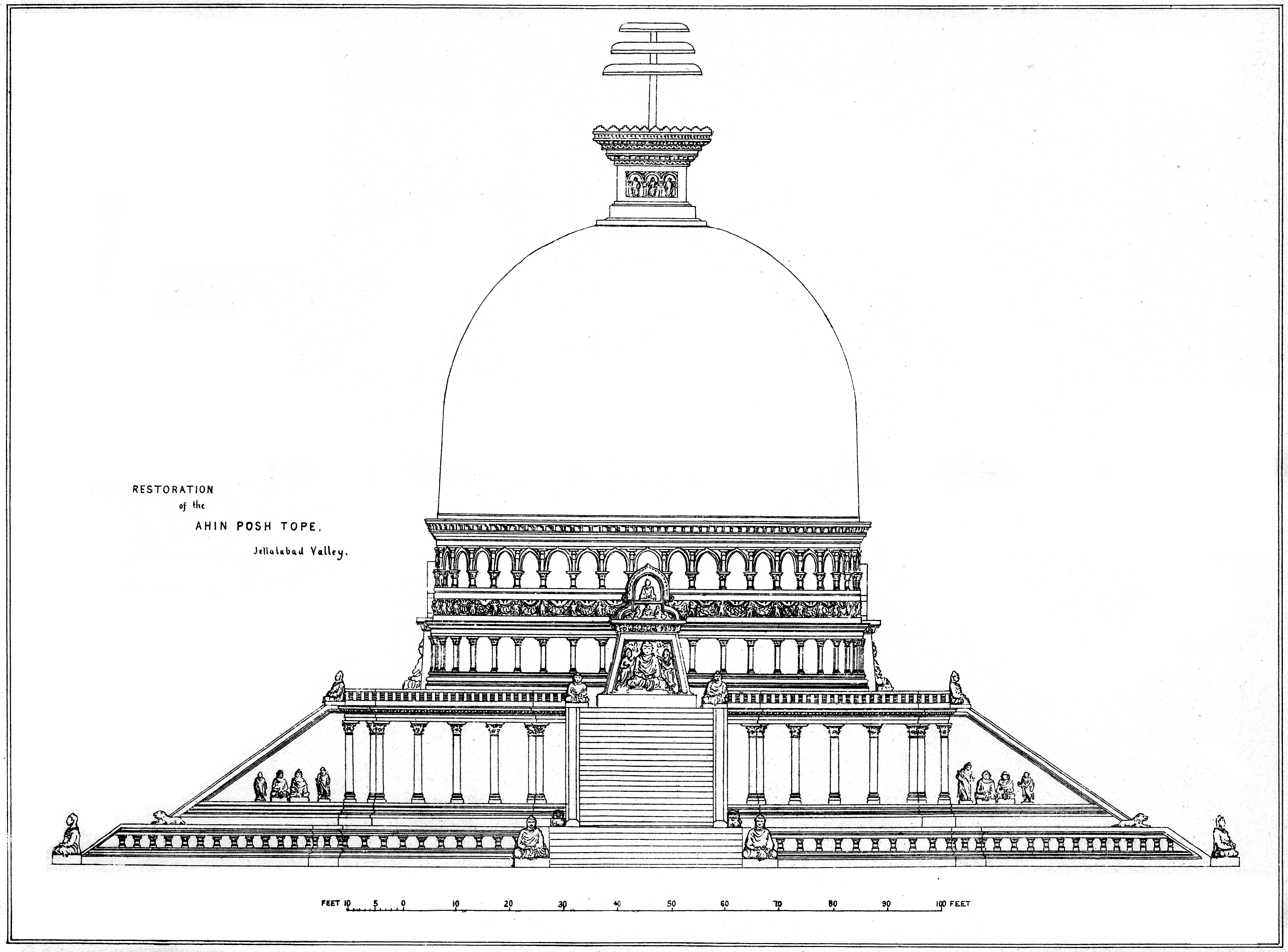
Ahin Posh stupa excavated and drawn by William Simpson in 1878

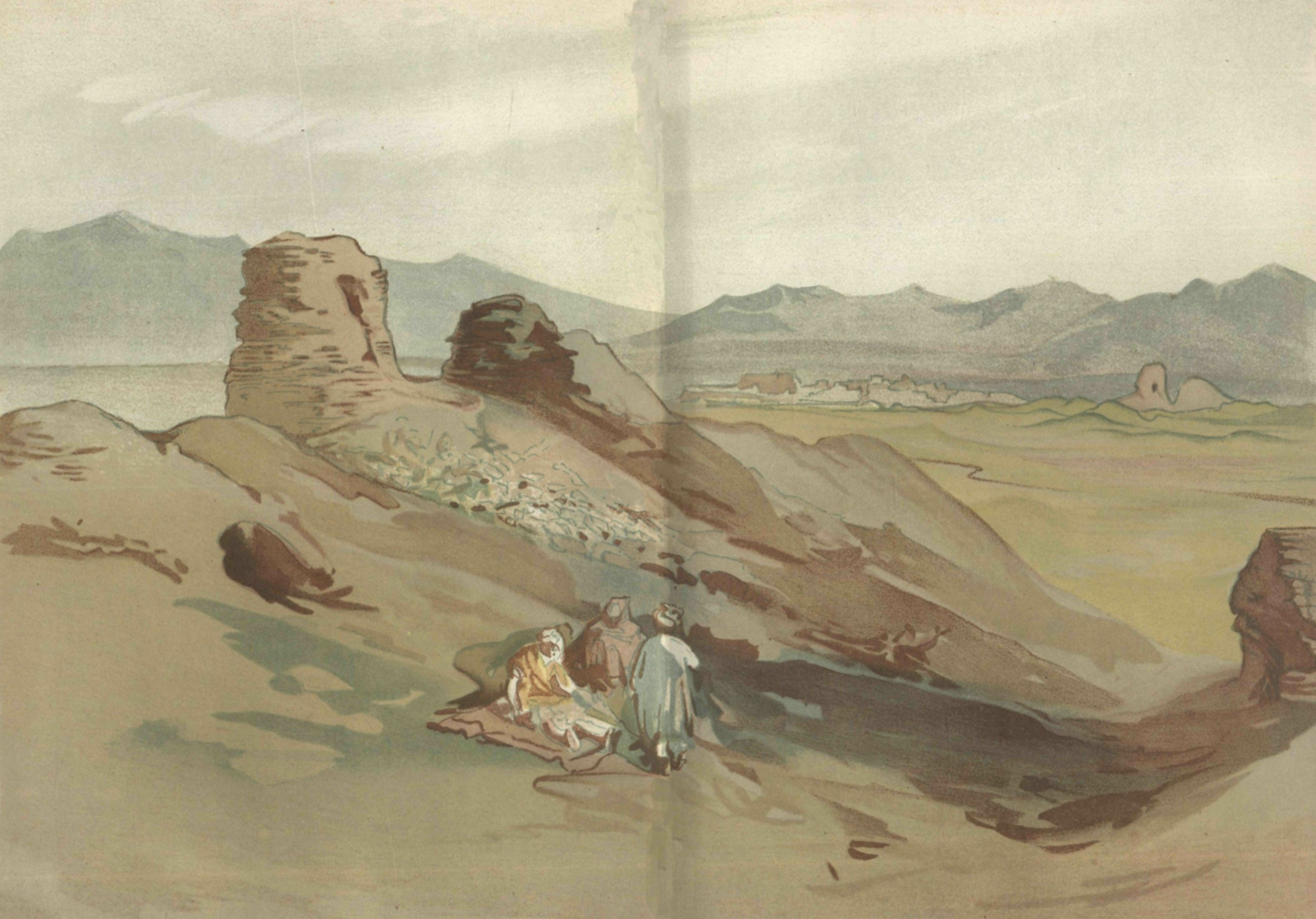
Buddhist stupas at Hadda, by Simpson in 1881

On 15 October 1878, Simpson left London en route to Afghanistan to provide illustrations of the Second Anglo-Afghan War. Travelling via Lahore and Peshawar, he passed through the Khyber Pass and witnessed the 'first shot' fired at the Battle of Ali Masjid.

He became friendly with Sir Louis Cavagnari who encouraged Simpson with his explorations of ancient Buddhist stupas in and around the Jalalabad Valley. While the Peshawar Valley Field Force was encamped at Jalalabad and later Gandamak, Simpson was allowed to have some soldiers to help him excavate Ahin Posh Tope and several other sites. As he excavated the Ahin Posh stupa in February 1879, he cleared the base of the stupa and dug a tunnel to the centre, where he discovered important relics and deposits, now in the British Museum. He also made drawing reconstitutions based on his findings. On one occasion, he was shot at by an Afghan but the bullet just missed.

At Gandamak, he met the photographer John Burke and his counterpart at The Graphic, Frederic Villiers, and after the departure of Archibald Forbes, Simpson took over the task of supplying the Daily News with accounts of the campaign. In May 1879, he observed the signing of a peace treaty at Gandamak which ended the war for the time being. When it was decided to send a mission to Kabul, Simpson applied to go but was turned down. His primary interest in accompanying the mission was to visit the giant Buddhas at Bamyan, but had he gone to Kabul, he probably would have been killed liked the rest of the mission. It was this event which precipitated the second part of the war.

Simpson returned to London in the summer of 1879. Upon his arrival, he visited the offices of the Illustrated London News on the Strand and collected all his sketches and watercolours which he proceeded to mount in two large albums. He also presented several papers to various learned societies on such aspects as Buddhist prayer wheels, sculptured topes and ancient remains in the Jalalabad Valley. In the same year he was elected a full member of the Institute of Painters in Water Colours.

In 1884, Simpson returned to Afghanistan with General Sir Peter Lumsden as part of the Afghan Boundary Commission. It was his last major trip abroad. Having spent the winter on the Afghan border, he set off for London in February 1885. As a result, he narrowly missed the Panjdeh incident in March, in which several hundred Afghans were killed by the advancing Russian army. Simpson reached London, therefore, at a time of great interest in the Boundary Commission and feverish speculation about the possibility of war with Russia. He received invitations to visit Lord Granville, then the Foreign Secretary, as well as various members of the royal family.

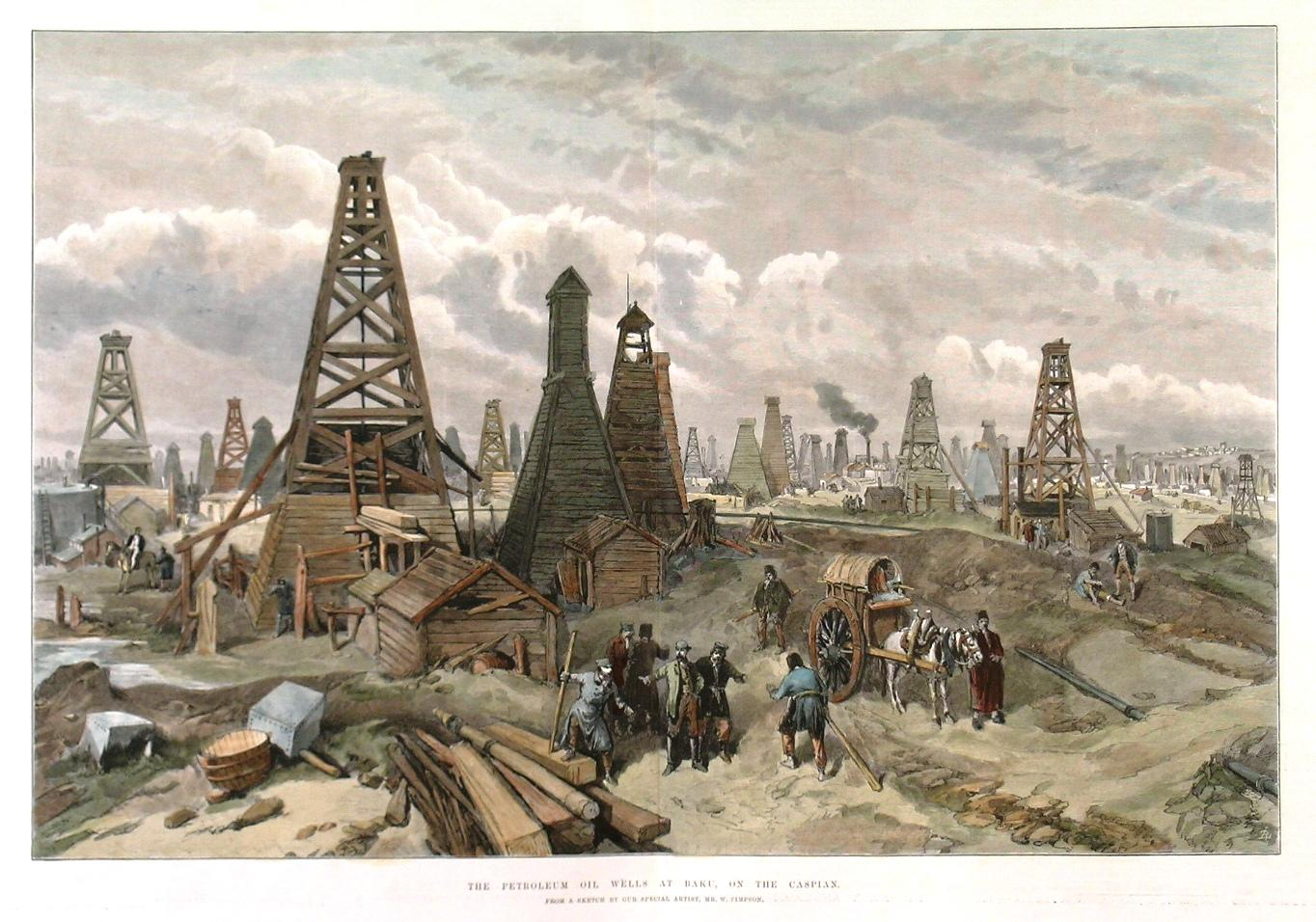
The Petroleum Oil Wells at Baku, on the Caspian. Simpson illustrated the city during his journey back from Afghanistan in 1885.

Throughout the following decade, Simpson continued his travels on behalf of his newspaper covering such events as royal weddings and coronations. In 1890, he observed the opening of the Forth Bridge and caught a chill which was to have detrimental effects on his health.

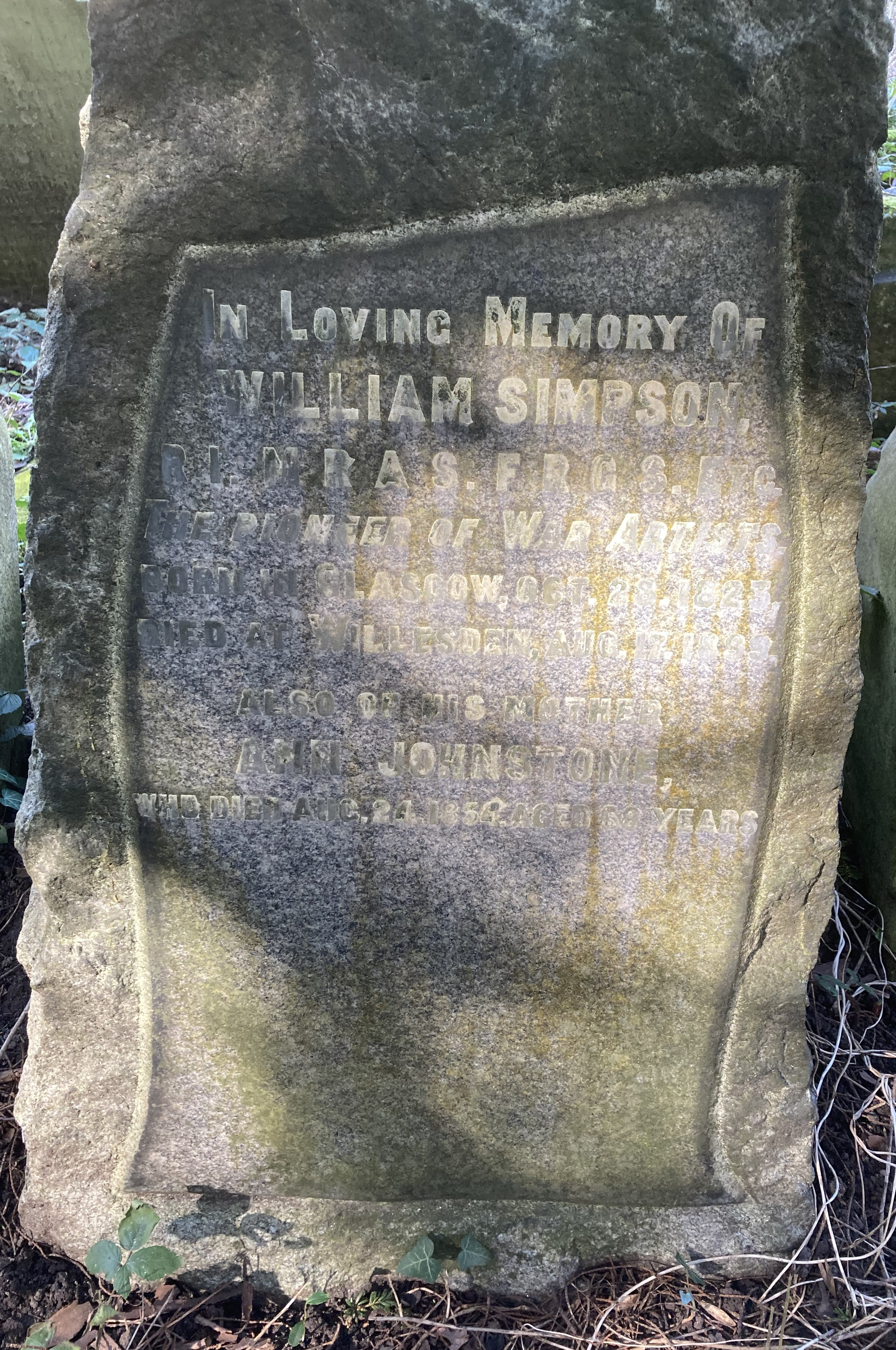
Grave of William Simpson in Highgate Cemetery (west side)

== Membership ==
William Simpson was a member of a number of different organisations, reflecting his interests.

- Member of the Royal Institute of Painters in Water Colours
- Honorary member of the Royal Institute of British Architects
- Executive committee of the Palestine Exploration Fund
- Fellow of the Royal Geographical Society
- Member of the Royal Asiatic Society
- Honorary librarian to the Society of Biblical Archaeology
- Member of the Alpine Club (UK)
- Member of the Omar Khayyam Club

== Family and death ==
Simpson married late in life to Maria Eliza Burt herself a portrait painter, and had one daughter, Ann Penelope born in 1884, who eventually emigrated to Australia. He died at home in Willesden, North London, on 17 August 1899 aged 75, and was buried in Highgate Cemetery.

== Works by (books) ==
- Brackenbury, G. & Simpson, W (1855). The campaign in the Crimea: an historical sketch London: P. and D. Colnaghi
- Simpson, William (1867). India ancient and modern: a series of illustrations of the country and the people of India and adjacent territories; executed in chromo-lithography from drawings by William Simpson; with descriptive literature by John William Kaye. London: Day and Son
- Simpson, William (1871). A Souvenir of the War of 1870-1, from the commencement to the fall of Paris. Illustrated with portraits of eminent personages and generals, ... with views of Strasbourg, Sedan, and Metz. London
- ACTON, Roger (1872). The Abyssinian Expedition and the Life and Reign of King Theodore. With illustrations by the special artists [W. Simpson, R. Baigrie and others] and correspondents of the Illustrated London News, and reprinted from that journal.
- Simpson, William (1874). Meeting the Sun: a Journey all round the World through Egypt, China, Japan and California, including an account of the marriage ceremonies of the emperor of China. London: Longmans, Green, Reader, and Dyer
- Simpson, William (1876). Picturesque people: being groups from all quarters of the globe. London: W. M. Thompson
- Simpson, William (1876). Shikāre and Tomāsha : a souvenir of the visit of H.R.H. the Prince of Wales to India . London
- Simpson, William (1896). The Buddhist Praying Wheel London: Macmillan
- Simpson, William (1899). The Jonah Legend: a suggestion of interpretation. London: Grant Richards
- Simpson, William (1899). Glasgow in the Forties (ed. A.H. Miller). Morison Brothers.
- Simpson, William (1902). The seat of war in the East, from eighty-one drawings made during the war in the Crimea London, Day & Son etc.
- Simpson, William (edited by G. Eyre-Todd, 1903). The Autobiography of William Simpson London, T. F. Unwin

== Works by (selected articles) ==
- Simpson, William, 'A contribution to the History of Lithography', The Lithographer, 1854
- Simpson, William, 'The architecture of India', RIBA Trans. (Royal Institute of British Architects), May 1862, pp. 165–178.
- Simpson, William, 'Arkite Ceremonies in the Himalayas', Good Words, 1866, pp. 601–608.
- Simpson, William, 'Praying Machines', Good Words, 1867, pp. 845–850.
- Simpson, William, 'An artist's jottings in Abyssinia', Good Words, 1 October 1868, pp. 605–613.
- Simpson, William, 'Church architecture of Abyssinia', RIBA Trans, 1869, pp. 234–246.
- Simpson, William, 'The Royal Quarries', Palestine Exploration Fund, 1870, pp. 373–379.
- Simpson, William, 'Jerusalem', Society for Biblical Archaeology, 1872, pp. 310–327.
- Simpson, William, 'The architecture of China', RIBA Trans, 1873, pp. 33–50.
- Simpson, William, 'China's future place in Philology', Macmillan's Magazine. Nov. 1873, pp. 45–48.
- Simpson, William, 'Gangootree', Alpine Journal, May 1874, pp. 385–397.
- Simpson, William, 'Symbolism of Oriental Ornament', Royal Society of the Arts Journal, Vol. 22, 1874, pp. 488–494.
- Simpson, William, 'The Modoc Region', RGS Procs. Vol. XIX, 1874–75, pp. 292–302.
- Simpson, William, 'The Tenno-Sama, or Mikoshi; Ark-Shrines of Japan', Transactions of the Society for Biblical Archaeology, 1877, pp. 550–554.
- Simpson, William, On the identification of Nagarahara : with reference to the travels of Hiouen-Thsang, 1881, Royal Asiatic Society of Great Britain and Ireland
- Simpson, William, Pujahs in the Sutlej Valley, Himalayas.” The Journal of the Royal Asiatic Society of Great Britain and Ireland, vol. 16, no. 1, 1884, pp. 13–30.
- Simpson, William, 'Architecture in the Himalayas', RIBA Trans. (Royal Institute of British Architects), Jan. 1883, pp. 65–80.
- Simpson, William, 'In the trenches before Sebastopol', English Illustrated Magazine, December 1895.
- Simpson, William, 'Winter and Summer in the trenches of Sebastopol', English Illustrated Magazine, April 1896, pp. 33–42.
- Simpson, William, 'The orientation or direction of temples', London : Published for the Quatuor coronati lodge no. 2076 by G.W. Speth, 1897.

== Exhibition catalogues ==
- Watercolour Drawings of India, Thibet & Cashmire, exhibition catalogue, German Gallery, 168, New Bond Street, 1867.
- Underground Jerusalem : descriptive catalogue of the above collection of water-colour drawings / by William Simpson, on view and for sale at the Pall Mall Gallery, from April 6th, 1872.
- Round the world : or, Pictures from the four quarters of the globe : descriptive catalogue of a collection of water-colour drawings and sketches from France, Italy ... Niagara &c. / by William Simpson; on view and for sale at Burlington Gallery, 191, Piccadilly, from March 16, 1874.
- India "special" / by William Simpson : an exhibition of sketches taken during the tour in India of H.R.H. the Prince of Wales; on view and for sale at Burlington Gallery, 191, Piccadilly, from May 29, 1876
- Mycenae, Troy, and Ephesus : a collection of water-colour drawings & sketches, illustrative of recent exploration and discoveries at these places, exhibition catalogue, 1878
- Catalogue of Exhibition of War Sketches by the late William Simpson, R.I., R.B.A., F.R.G.S. at Graves' Galleries, 6, Pall Mall, S.W. 1900.
