= John Alexander Cameron =

Scottish war correspondent

- Born: Inverness, Scotland
- Died: 19 January 1885; Khartoum, Sudan
- Occupation: War correspondent

John Alexander Cameron (died 19 January 1885) was a Scottish war correspondent.

== Biography ==
Cameron was descended from the Camerons of Kinlochiel. He was born at Inverness, where he was for some time a bank clerk. Subsequently, he went out to India, and was connected with a mercantile house in Bombay. He began contributing to the Bombay Gazette, and was for some time acting editor, when on the outbreak of the Afghan war in 1878 he was appointed special correspondent. When towards the close of the following year the war broke out afresh, he became correspondent of the London Standard. Joining the column under General Phayrer sent to the relief of Candahar, he was the first to ride with the news of the victory of General Roberts to the nearest telegraph post, beating all other competitors by a day and a half. Then returning to Candahar he went out to the battlefield of Maiwand (July 1880), his description of which established his reputation as one of the most graphic of newspaper correspondents. On the outbreak of the Boer insurrection (December 1880) he crossed from Bombay to Natal, arriving there long before the correspondents from England. He was present (January 1881) at the battles of Loing's Nek and Ingogo, and, though taken prisoner at the fatal fight on Majuba Hill (February 1881), contrived on the following day to dispatch his famous message descriptive of the battle. On the conclusion of peace he returned to England, but on the news of the riots in Alexandria (June 1882) he left for Egypt, and was present on board the admiral's ship Invincible at the bombardment of the town. He afterwards continued with the British troops throughout the Egyptian campaign until their arrival in Cairo. After a short interval he set out for Madagascar, his letters from which attracted much attention. As the French delayed their attack on the island, he crossed the Pacific to Melbourne, and thence made his way to Tonquin, and was present at the engagement in which the French failed to carry the defences which the Black Flags had erected. English correspondents not being permitted to remain with the French forces, he was on his way home when Osman Digna's forces began to threaten Souakim, and on reaching Suez he immediately took ship for that port. When Baker Pasha's force was crushed by the Arabs, he narrowly escaped with his life. He accompanied the British expeditionary force in their advance upon Tokar, and witnessed the battles of El Teb and Tamanieh. After a short stay in England he set out to join the Nile expedition in 1884, regarding the progress of which he sent home many telegrams and letters. He was killed 19 January 1885, two days after the first Battle of Abu Klea.

== See also ==
- List of journalists killed during the Mahdist War
