= William Hicks (Indian Army officer) =

British army officer (1830–1883)

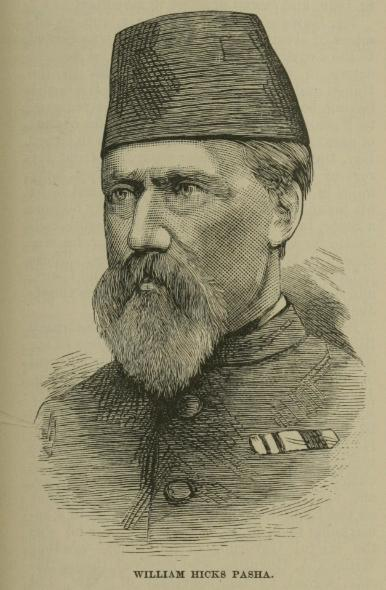
- Born: 1830; Great Britain
- Died: 5 November 1883 (aged 53); El Obeid, Sudan
- Military career
- Allegiance: United Kingdom; Khedivate of Egypt
- Branch: Bombay Army; Egyptian Army
- Service years: 1849 – 1883
- Rank: Colonel
- Conflicts: Indian Rebellion of 1857; 1868 Expedition to Abyssinia; 1882 Anglo-Egyptian War; Mahdist War: Battle of El Obeid †

Colonel William Hicks (1830 – 5 November 1883), also known as Hicks Pasha, was a British army officer who joined the Bombay Army in 1849, and served through the Indian Rebellion of 1857, being mentioned in dispatches for good conduct at the action of Sitka Ghaut in 1859.

In 1861 he became captain, and in the 1868 Expedition to Abyssinia was a brigade major, being again mentioned in dispatches and given a brevet majority. He retired with the honorary rank of colonel in 1880.

He then entered the service of the Egyptian government, who controlled Sudan. He led the Egyptian army that was defeated at the Battle of Shaykan, in which he was killed and decapitated.

== Service to the Khedive ==
After the close of the 1882 Anglo-Egyptian War, he entered the Khedive's service and was made a Pasha. In 1881, Sudan was controlled by Egypt; Muhammad Ahmad proclaimed himself Mahdi and began conquering neighboring territory and thus threatening the precarious Egyptian control of the territory. Early in 1883 Hicks went to Khartoum as chief of the staff of the army there, then commanded by Suliman Niazi Pasha. Camp was formed at Omdurman and a new force of some 8,000 fighting men collected—mostly recruited from the fellahin of Arabi's disbanded troops, sent in chains from Egypt. After a month of vigorous drilling Hicks led 5,000 of his men against an equal force of dervishes in Sennar, whom he defeated, and cleared the country between the towns of Sennar and Khartoum of rebels.

== 1883 expedition ==
Relieved of the fear of an immediate attack by the Mahdists, the Egyptian officials at Khartoum intrigued against Hicks, who in July tendered his resignation. This resulted in the dismissal of Suliman Niazi and the appointment of Hicks as commander-in-chief of an expeditionary force to Kordofan with orders to crush the Mahdi, who in January 1883 had captured El Obeid, the capital of that province. Hicks, aware of the worthlessness of his force for the purpose contemplated, stated his opinion that it would be best to "wait for Kordofan to settle itself" (telegram of 5 August).

The Egyptian ministry, however, did not then believe in the power of the Mahdi, and the expedition started from Khartoum on 9 September. It was made up of 7,000 infantry, 1,000 cavalry and 2,000 camp followers and included thirteen Europeans. On the 10th the force left the Nile at Duem and struck inland across the almost waterless wastes of Kordofan for El Obeid. On 5 November the army, misled by possibly treacherous and thirst-stricken guides, was ambushed in dense forest at Kashgil, 30 miles (48 km) south of El Obeid. Only 300 of the force's men survived. (See the Battle of El Obeid).

According to the story of Hicks's cook, one of the survivors, the general was the last officer to fall, pierced by the spear of the Khalifa Mahommed Sherif. Hicks's head was cut off and taken to the Mahdi.

== Cultural depictions ==
Hicks was played by Edward Underdown in the 1966 film Khartoum.
