= La Curée =

1872 novel by Émile Zola

- Author: Émile Zola
- Translator: Arthur Goldhammer
- Language: French
- Series: Les Rougon-Macquart
- Genre: Novel
- Publication date: 1872
- Publication place: France
- English publication date: 2004
- Pages: 320 (paperback)
- Preceded by: His Excellency Eugène Rougon
- Followed by: Money

La Curée (English: The Kill) is the 2nd novel in Émile Zola's 20-volume series Les Rougon-Macquart serialised from 1871 to 1872 and published in book form in 1872. It deals with property speculation and the lives of the extremely wealthy Nouveau riche of the Second French Empire, against the backdrop of Baron Haussmann's reconstruction of Paris in the 1850s and 1860s.

Vastly different from its predecessor and prequel La Fortune des Rougon, La Curée - the portion of the game thrown to the dogs after a hunt, and thus usually translated as The Kill - is a character study of three personalities: Aristide Rougon (renamed "Saccard")--the youngest son of the ruthless and calculating peasant Pierre Rougon and the bourgeois Félicité (by whom he is much spoiled), both of them Bonapartistes and consumed by a desire for wealth, Aristide's young second wife Renée (his first dying not long after their move from provincial Plassans to Paris) and Maxime, Aristide's foppish son from his first marriage.

== Plot summary ==
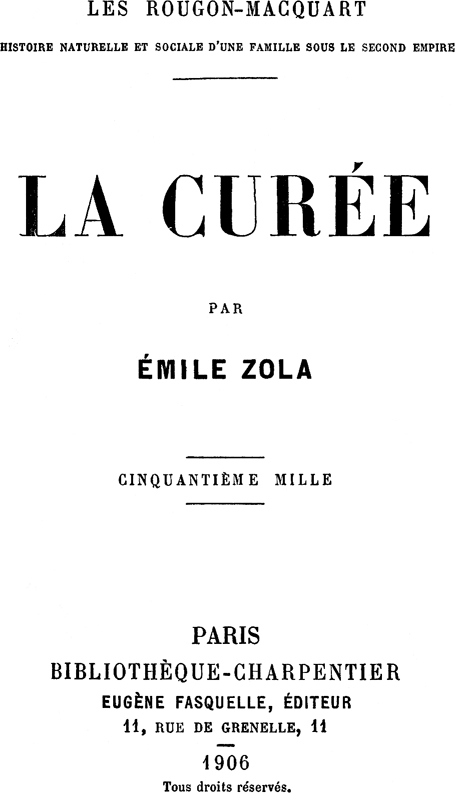
La Curée

The book opens with scenes of astonishing opulence, beginning with Renée and Maxime lazing in a luxurious horse-drawn carriage, very slowly leaving a Parisian park (the Bois de Boulogne) in the 19th century-equivalent of a traffic jam. It is made clear very early on that these are staggeringly wealthy characters not subject to the cares faced by the public; they arrive at their mansion and spend hours being dressed by their servants prior to hosting a banquet attended by some of the richest people in Paris. There seems to be almost no continuity between this scene and the end of the previous novel, until the second chapter begins and Zola reveals that this opulent scene takes place almost fourteen years later. Zola then rewinds time to pick up the story practically minutes after La Fortune des Rougon] ended.

Following Eugene Rougon's rise to political power in Paris in La Fortune, his younger brother Aristide, featured in the first novel as a talentless journalist, a comic character unable to commit himself unequivocally to the imperial cause and thus left out in the cold when the rewards were being handed out, decides to follow Eugene to Paris to help himself to the wealth and power he now believes to be his birthright. Eugene promises to help Aristide achieve these things on the condition that he stay out of his way and change his surname to avoid the possibility of bad publicity from Aristide's escapades rubbing off on Eugene and damaging his political chances. Aristide chooses the surname Saccard and Eugene gets him a seemingly mundane job at the city planning permission office. The renamed Saccard soon realises that, far from the disappointment he thought the job would be, he is actually in a position to gain insider information on the houses and other buildings that are to be demolished to build Paris's bold new system of boulevards. Knowing that the owners of these properties ordered to be demolished by the city government were compensated handsomely, Saccard contrives to borrow money in order to buy up these properties before their status becomes public and then make massive profits.

Saccard is at first unable to get the money to make his initial investments but then his wife falls victim to a terminal illness. Even while she lies dying in the next room, Saccard (in a brilliant scene of breathtaking callousness) is already making arrangements to marry rich girl Renée, who is pregnant and whose family wishes to avoid scandal by offering a huge dowry to any man who will marry her and claim the baby as his own. Saccard accepts and his career in speculation is born. He sends his youngest daughter back home to Plassans and packs his older son Maxime off to a Parisian boarding school; we meet Maxime again when he leaves school several years later and meets his new stepmother Renée, who is at least seven years older.

The flashback complete, the rest of the novel takes place after Saccard has made his fortune, against the backdrop of his luxurious mansion and his profligacy and is concerned with a three-cornered plot of sexual and political intrigue. Renée and Maxime begin a semi-incestuous love affair, which Saccard suspects but appears to tolerate, perhaps due to the commercial nature of his marriage to Renée. Saccard is trying to get Renée to part with the deeds to her family home, which would be worth millions but which she refuses to give up. The novel continues in this vein with the tensions continuing to mount and culminates in a series of bitter observations by Zola on the hypocrisy and immorality of the nouveau riche.

A near-penniless journalist at the time of writing La Curée, Zola himself had no experience of the scenes he describes. In order to counter this lack, he toured a large number of stately homes around France, taking copious notes on subjects like architecture, ladies' and men's fashions, jewellery, garden design, greenhouse plants (a seduction scene takes place in Saccard's hothouse), carriages, mannerisms, servants' liveries; these notes (volumes of which are preserved) were time well spent, as many contemporary observers praised the novel for its realism.

== Key themes ==
- Speculation (signified by Aristide)
- Dissipation (symbolized by Renée)
- Sexual/Gender deviance (personified in Maxime)
- The Rise of a New Bourgeoisie (cf. Speculation)
- The Expiration of the Old Bourgeoisie (symbolized in the Hôtel Béraud)
- The Attempt to Harness Nature, or Instincts Overly-Sated (the greenhouse)
- Gluttony (common theme in Zola)
- Immorality (common theme in Zola)

== Primary characters ==
- Aristide (Rougon) Saccard, speculator
- Renée Saccard, wife of Aristide Saccard
- Maxime Rougon, son of Aristide; dandy
- Sidonie Rougon, sister of Aristide; procuress
- Eugène Rougon, brother of Aristide; politician
- Madame Lauwerens, procuress
- Louise, fiancée of Maxime; hunchback
- Suzanne Haffner & Adeline d’Espanet, Renée's best friends, also a lesbian couple

== English translations ==
=== Expurgated ===
The novel was first translated (translator unknown) very poorly and with many bowdlerizations and reissued by Henry Vizetelly in the 1880s and 1890s under the title The Rush for the Spoil, with an introduction by George Moore.

=== Unexpurgated ===
An unexpurgated translation by the poet and critic Alexander Texeira de Mattos was published in a limited edition in 1895 under the French title, with an English equivalent (The Hounds' Fee) in parentheses. This translation, retitled The Kill upon its 1954 reprinting, was the standard English text of the novel for over a century. The critic Graham King remarked that "its remarkably timeless tone no doubt acts as a deterrent to a more modern competitor."

In 2004, two new English translations by Arthur Goldhammer (Modern Library) and Brian Nelson (Oxford World's Classics) were published to acclaim.

1. Alexander Texeira de Mattos (1895, reprinted 1954)
2. Arthur Goldhammer (Modern Library) (2004)
3. Brian Nelson (Oxford World's Classics) (2004)

== Adaptations ==
La Curée was adapted in the 1917 silent Italian film La cuccagna, directed by Baldassarre Negroni.

Director Roger Vadim updated the setting to modern-day Paris in the 1966 film La Curée, released in English-speaking markets as The Game Is Over. The film starred Jane Fonda, Peter McEnery and Michel Piccoli.

== Critical works ==
- Charle, Christophe. A Social History of France in the 19th Century. Trans. Miriam Kochan. Oxford: Berg, 1994.
- Nelson, Brian. "Speculation and Dissipation: A Reading of Zola’s La Curée".
- Petrey, Sandy. "Stylistics and Society in La Curée." MLN, October, 1974. pp. 626–640.
- Sedgwick, Eve Kosofsky. Between Men: English Literature and Male Homosocial Desire. New York: Columbia University Press, 1985.
