= Château du Tholonet =

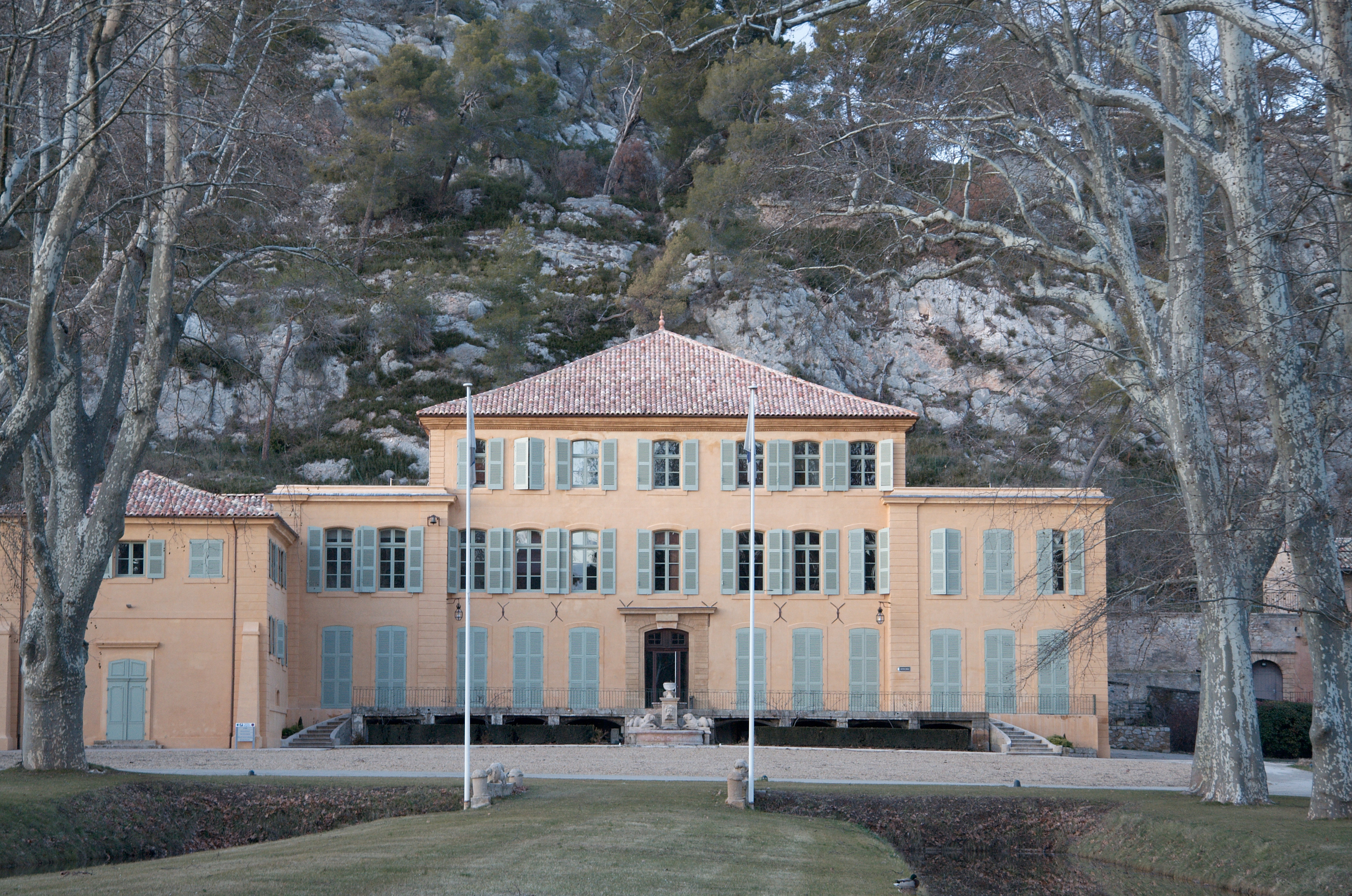
- The chateau in 2010.
- Interactive map of the Château du Tholonet area

General information
- Type: Château
- Location: Le Tholonet, France
- Coordinates: 43.5242°N 5.5094°E
- Completed: 1776
- Client: Alexandre de Gallifet
- Owner: Société du Canal de Provence

The Château du Tholonet is an historic château or bastide in Le Tholonet near Aix-en-Provence, France.

== History ==
The estate was acquired by Alexandre de Gallifet, who served as the President of the Parlement of Aix-en-Provence, from the d'Albertas family in 1646. The bastide was completed in 1776, a decade prior to the French Revolution. It was later inherited by Gaston Alexandre Auguste, Marquis de Galliffet, who opposed the construction of the Zola Dam in 1838.

It has been home to the Société du Canal de Provence since 1959.
