= Au Bonheur des Dames =

1883 novel by Émile Zola

The ladies' delight
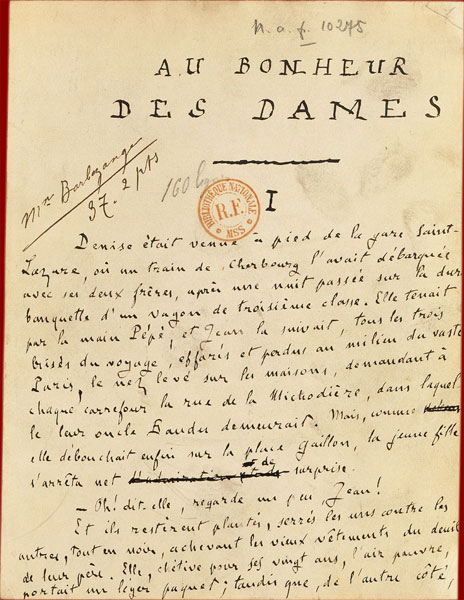
- Au Bonheur des Dames manuscript
- Author: Émile Zola
- Translator: Robin Buss
- Language: French
- Series: Les Rougon-Macquart
- Genre: Novel
- Publisher: Charpentier (book form)
- Publication date: 1882–1883 (serial); 1883 (book)
- Publication place: France
- English publication date: 2001
- Media type: Print (serial, hardback, and paperback)
- Pages: 480 (paperback)
- Preceded by: Pot Luck
- Followed by: The Sin of Father Mouret

Au Bonheur des Dames (French pronunciation: [obɔnœʁ deˈdam]; The Ladies' Delight or The Ladies' Paradise) is the eleventh novel in the Rougon-Macquart series by Émile Zola. It was first serialized in the periodical Gil Blas from December 17, 1882 to March 1, 1883; and published in novel form by Charpentier in 1883.

The novel is set in the world of the department store, a novel development in mid-nineteenth century retail sales. Zola models his store after Le Bon Marché, which consolidated under one roof many of the goods hitherto sold in separate shops. The narrative details many of Le Bon Marché's innovations, including its mail-order business, its system of commissions, its staff commissary, and its methods of receiving and retailing goods.

Au Bonheur des Dames is a sequel to Pot-Bouille. Like its predecessor, Au Bonheur des Dames focuses on Octave Mouret, who at the end of the previous novel married Caroline Hédouin, the owner of a small silk shop. Now a widower, Octave has expanded the business into an international retail powerhouse occupying, at the beginning of the book, the greater part of a city block.

== Plot summary ==
The events of Au Bonheur des Dames take place between 1864 and 1869. The novel tells the story of Denise Baudu, a 20-year-old woman from Valognes who comes to Paris with her younger brothers and begins working as a saleswoman at the department store "Au Bonheur des Dames". Zola describes the inner workings of the store from the employees' perspective, including the 13-hour workdays, the substandard food and the bare lodgings for the female staff. Many of the conflicts in the novel spring from each employee's struggle for advancement and the malicious infighting and gossip among the staff.

Denise's story is played against the career of Octave Mouret, the owner of Au Bonheur des Dames, whose retail innovations and store expansions threaten the existence of all the neighborhood shops. Under one roof, Octave has gathered textiles (silks, woolens) as well as all manner of ready-made garments (dresses, coats, lingerie, gloves), accessories necessary for making clothes, and ancillary items like carpeting and furniture. His aim is to overwhelm the senses of his female customers, forcing them to spend by bombarding them with an array of buying choices and by juxtaposing goods in enticing and intoxicating ways. Massive advertising, huge sales, home delivery and a system of refunds and novelties such as a reading room and a snack bar further induce his female clientele to patronize his store in growing numbers. In the process, he drives the traditional retailers who operate smaller speciality shops out of business.

In Pot-Bouille, an earlier novel, Octave is depicted as a ladies' man, sometimes inept, who seduces or attempts to seduce women who can give him some social or financial advantage. In Au Bonheur des Dames, he uses a young widow to influence a political figure–modeled after Baron Haussmann–to gain frontage access to a huge thoroughfare, the present day rue de Quatre-Septembre, for the store. Despite his contempt for women, Octave finds himself slowly falling in love with Denise, whose refusal to be seduced by his charms further inflames him. The book ends with Denise admitting her love for Octave and agreeing to marry him.

The depiction of women is modern. The department store is described as a place where female customers can live out their fantasies and impulses; for the female employees, it offers the possibility of financial independence.

== Relationship to the other Rougon-Macquart novels ==
Zola designed the Rougon-Macquart novels to demonstrate how heredity and environment operate on the members of one family over the course of the Second French Empire. In this case, the environment is the department store.

Octave Mouret is introduced briefly in La fortune des Rougon. He plays a larger but background role in La conquête de Plassans, which focuses on his parents, the first cousins Marthe Rougon and François Mouret. As an innovator and risk-taker, Octave combines his mother's imagination with his father's business sense, making the department store the perfect milieu for his gifts.

Octave's brother is the priest Serge (La faute de l'Abbé Mouret), who served as a guardian to their mentally challenged sister Desirée.

In Le docteur Pascal, the final novel in the series set in 1872–1873, Octave and Denise are married and have three children. Octave also appears briefly or is mentioned in La joie de vivre and L'œuvre.

== Adaptations ==
The novel has been adapted for film several times.

- Zum Paradies der Damen (1922) directed by Lupu Pick
- Au bonheur des dames (1930) directed by Julien Duvivier starring Dita Parlo
- Au Bonheur des Dames (English: Shop Girls of Paris) (1943) directed by André Cayatte starring Blanchette Brunoy

The BBC used the novel as the basis for a 2012 eight-part television series set in northern England titled The Paradise. It starred Joanna Vanderham and Emun Elliott. The BBC launched a second series in October 2013.

The novel was also adapted as an Italian language television series in 2015, Il Paradiso delle Signore, which has run for several seasons and stars Giuseppe Zeno and Giusy Buscemi.

The novel was adapted for the stage, with the title The Department Store, by Justin Fleming, and was premiered at The Old Fitzroy Theatre Sydney in 2005, directed by Christopher Hurrell.

The novel was adapted into a play for BBC Radio 4 that premiered in September 2010.

== English Translations ==
=== Expurgated ===
1. Shop Girls of Paris (1883, tr. Mary Neal Sherwood, T.B. Peterson & Bros.)
2. The Ladies' Paradise (1883, tr. Frank Belmont, Tinsley Bros.)
3. The Ladies' Paradise (1886, tr. Frank Belmont, edited for H. Vizetelly, Vizetelly & Co.)
4. The Ladies' Paradise (1895, tr. Frank Belmont, edited by Ernest Alfred Vizetelly, Hutchinson & Co.)

=== Unexpurgated ===
1. Ladies' Delight (1957, tr. April Fitzlyon, John Calder)
2. The Ladies Paradise (1995, tr. Brian Nelson, Oxford University Press)
3. Au Bonheur des Dames (The Ladies' Delight) (2001, tr. Robin Buss, Penguin Books)

== See also ==
- Aristide Boucicaut
- Grands Magasins du Louvre
- Kleptomania
- La Samaritaine
- Ready-to-wear
- Retailing
- Shopping
- The Vanishing Lady (illusion)

== Sources ==
- Brown, F. (1995). Zola: A life. New York: Farrar, Straus & Giroux.
- Zola, E. Au Bonheur des Dames, translated as The Ladies' Paradise by Brian Nelson (1995).
- Zola, E. Au Bonheur des Dames, translated as The Ladies' Delight by Robin Buss (2002).
- Zola, E. Le doctor Pascal, translated as Doctor Pascal by E. A. Vizetelly (1893).
