= François Zola =

French engineer (1796–1847)

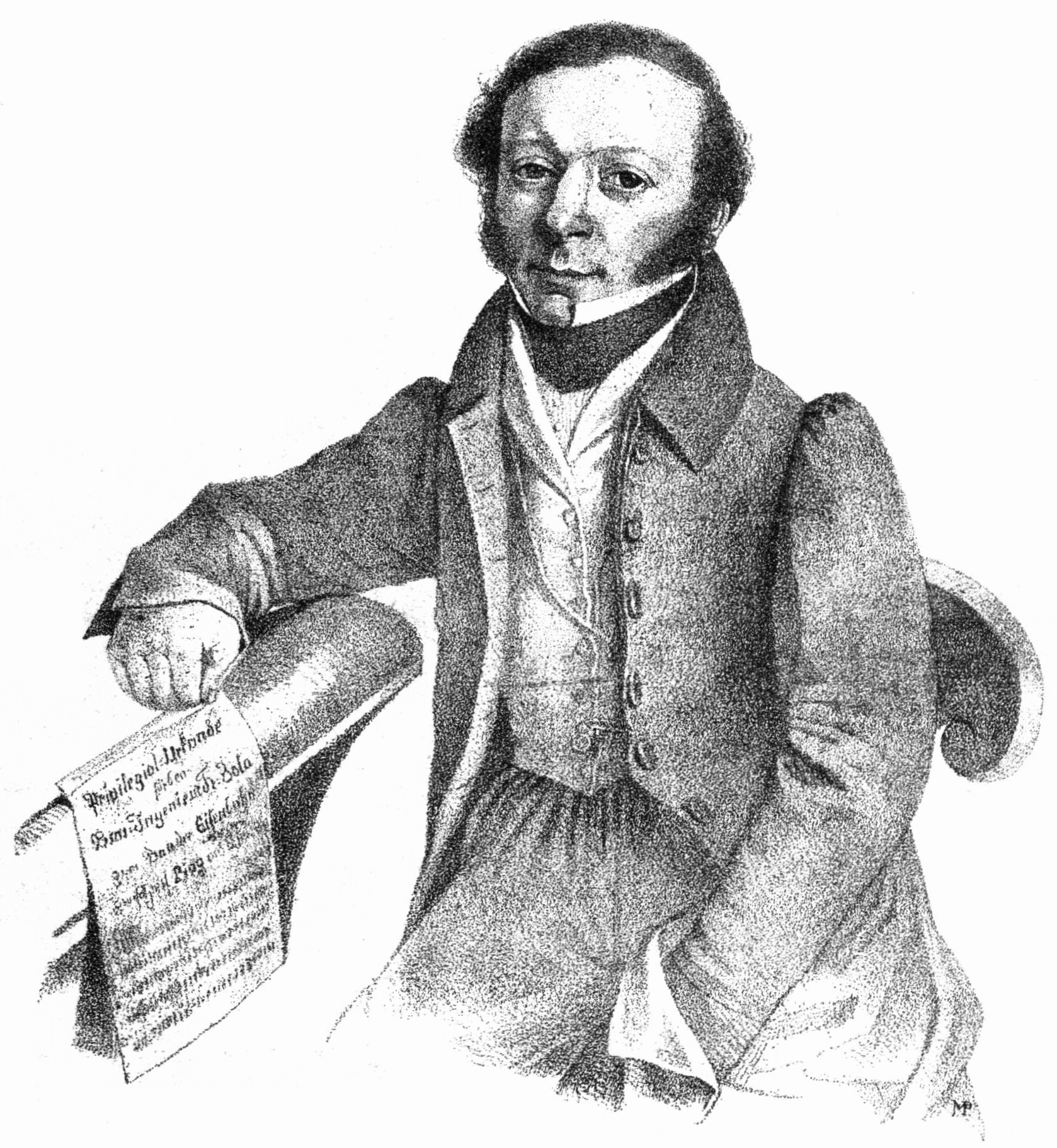
- Born: Francesco Antonio Giuseppe Maria Zolla; 7 August 1796; Venice, Republic of Venice
- Died: 27 March 1847 (aged 50); Marseille, France
- Resting place: Saint-Pierre Cemetery
- Occupation: Engineer
- Spouse: Émilie Aubert
- Children: Émile Zola

François Zola (born Francesco Antonio Giuseppe Maria Zolla; 7 August 1796 – 27 March 1847) was an Italian-born French engineer. He designed the Zola Dam, creating Lac Zola near Le Tholonet in Aix-en-Provence.

Zola was an Italian engineer with some Greek ancestry, who was born in Venice in 1795; his mother was French.

He lived in Paris with his wife Émilie Aubert when their son, the author Émile Zola, was born in 1840. The family moved to Aix-en-Provence when Émile was three years old. François died four years later, in 1847.
