= L'Inondation =

1880 novella by Émile Zola

The Flood
- Author: Émile Zola
- Original title: L'Inondation
- Language: French
- Genre: Short story
- Publication date: 1880
- Publication place: France
- Media type: Print

L'Inondation (The Flood) is an 1880 novella by Émile Zola. Set in the village of Saint-Jory, several miles up the Garonne from Toulouse, it is the story of a family tragedy, told by its patriarch, seventy-year-old Louis Roubieu.

== Plot summary ==
On a beautiful May day, the Garonne floods, washing away all the bridges; ruining nearly two thousand houses; drowning hundreds; and leaving twenty thousand starving to death. The novella describes the immediate impact this flood has on one household.

== Film ==
Louis Delluc's last film, made in 1924, for Marcel L'Herbier's cinematic company Cinégraphic, was based on the book. Delluc caught and died of pneumonia in the filming.
