= La Terre =

1887 novel by Émile Zola

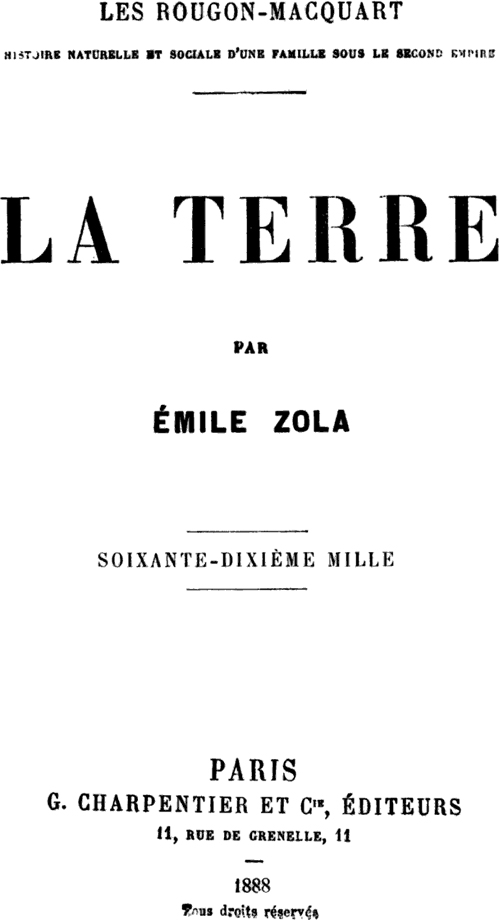
- The Earth (1887).
- Author: Émile Zola
- Translator: Douglas Parmee
- Language: French
- Series: Les Rougon-Macquart
- Genre: Naturalist novel
- Publisher: Charpentier
- Publication date: 1887
- Publication place: France
- English publication date: 1980
- Media type: Print (serial, hardback & paperback)
- Pages: 464 (paperback)
- Preceded by: Nana
- Followed by: The Debacle

La Terre (lit. 'The Earth') is a novel by Émile Zola, published in 1887. It is the fifteenth novel in Zola's Rougon-Macquart series. The action takes place in a rural community in the Beauce, an area in central France south of Paris. The novel is connected to others in the series by the protagonist, Jean Macquart, whose childhood in the south of France was recounted in La Fortune des Rougon, and who goes on to feature prominently in the later novel La Débâcle.

== Plot introduction ==
La Terre describes the steady disintegration of a family of agricultural workers in Second Empire France, in the years immediately before the outbreak of the Franco-Prussian War of 1870. It offers a vivid description of the hardships and brutality of rural life in the late nineteenth century.

== Plot summary ==
The novel takes place in the final years of the Second Empire. Jean Macquart, an itinerant farm worker, has come to Rognes, a small village in La Beauce, where he works as a day labourer. He had been a corporal in the French Army, a veteran of the Battle of Solferino. He begins to court a local girl, Françoise Mouche, who lives in the village with her sister Lise. Lise is married to Buteau, a young man from the village, who is attracted to both sisters.

Buteau's father, the elderly farmer Fouan, has decided to sign a contract known as a donation entre vifs (literally: "gift between living people"), whereby his three children, Fanny Delhomme (married to a hard-working and respected farmer), Hyacinthe (aka "Jesus Christ", a poacher and layabout), and Buteau will inherit their father's estate early; they agree to pay their parents a pension in return. The property is painstakingly measured and divided up between the three children, as the Civil Code of 1804 dictated. As stated by the French Civil Code of 1804 under the section "Donations and Testaments," any one may donate their land to persons older than the age of sixteen, especially between family members, without penalty. Almost as soon as the contract is signed, Buteau begins to resent the pension, and refuses to pay it. In the house Lise shares with her sister (the property having been shared between them on the death of their late father), Buteau begins a campaign of sexual advances towards his sister-in-law, which she attempts to repel.

Midway through the novel, Fouan's wife dies and, since it seems wasteful for Fouan to retain their marital home, the property is sold, and Fouan goes to live with Fanny and her husband. While Fanny is scrupulously respectful of the conditions of the donation, she nevertheless makes him unwelcome. Fouan eventually moves to live with his son "Jesus Christ" who shares a shack with his daughter "La Trouille", a put-upon dogsbody. Under "Jesus Christ's" influence, Fouan's self-respect dwindles: while previously law-abiding, he now joins his son on poaching expeditions and takes part in Hyacinthe's favourite evening activity, farting contests. Eventually, however, Hyacinthe's abusive drunkenness is directed against Fouan, who leaves to take up residence with Buteau and Lise.

Living with her sister and Buteau, Françoise is the victim of Buteau's sexual overtures. Lise, jealous of Françoise, insists that her sister is behaving in a deliberately provocative way. When Françoise turns 21 years old, she becomes entitled to her inheritance and she decides to leave the family home, demanding that Buteau and Lise buy out her share of the house, which the couple cannot afford to do. Françoise marries Jean and inherits her share of the family lands and home, infuriating her sister and Buteau.

Françoise is now pregnant with Jean's child, and in a shocking scene, Buteau and Lise set upon Françoise when she is alone in the fields at harvest time. Lise restrains her sister while she is raped by Buteau, then pushes her onto a sickle, wounding her in the belly and killing her unborn child. The two flee the scene. While Françoise is still conscious when she is found, her family pride leads her to refuse to name Lise and Buteau; she claims instead that her injury was the result of an accident, and dies shortly after.

Back in the Buteau home, the greedy couple turn their attention to Fouan, whose obstinacy in remaining alive has become a serious financial drain. One night while Fouan is asleep, they steal into his bedroom and smother him; finding he is still alive, they set fire to him, while arranging the scene to look like an accident (their story is accepted by the local community).

The Buteaus refuse to pay Jean the money for Françoise's share of the family home, which is now rightfully his as her next-of-kin. Horrified by his suspicions regarding both his wife's and Fouan's deaths, and by the heartlessness of those around him, Jean returns to his wandering, and leaves the region for good. As he leaves, he passes the freshly dug burial mounds of Françoise and Fouan, and the ripe corn in the harvest fields.

== Characters ==
The novels contains about 100 characters. Many have multiple names and extended family connections. The novel centers on the Fouans, a 300-year-old peasant farming family "dynasty", and an itinerant carpenter, Jean Macquart, who also appears in two other Zola novels.

Major characters:

- Badeuil, Charles - married Laure Fouan, and went to live at Chartres. He tried commerce without much success, and, haunted by a desire for rapid fortune, acquired a house of prostitution which had fallen into bad repute through mismanagement.
- Badeuil, Madame Laure - wife of Charles, was the youngest daughter of Joseph Casimir Fouan. She was the sister of La Grande, of Padre Fouan, and of Michel Fouan, known as Mouche. When her father's estate was divided, she got no land, but received an indemnity in money instead. After she and her husband acquired the prostitute establishment in Chartres, she assisted ably in its management.
- Badeuil, Estelle - daughter of Charles and Madame Badeuil, was educated by the Sisters of the Visitation at Chateaudun, and at eighteen was married to Hector Vaucogne, by whom she had one daughter, Elodie.
- Bécu - gamekeeper and bell-ringer at Rognes, was a man of fifty years of age who had at one time been in the army. He was an intense Bonapartist, and pretended that he had met the Emperor. Himself a confirmed drunkard, he was on friendly terms with Hyacinthe Fouan, whose poaching expeditions he overlooked.
- Bouteroue, Hilarion - second child of Vincent Bouteroue, and grandson of Marianne Fouan (La Grande). Hilarion, who was of weak intellect, was looked after from childhood by his sister Palmyre, who wore herself out in his service.
- Bouteroue, Palmyre - sister of Hilarion, worked like a slave to support her brother, to whom she held incestuous relations, and died completely worn out by toil and hardship at the age of thirty-five.
- Buteau - second son of Père Fouan; brother of Hyacinthe ("Jesus Christ") and of Fanny Delhomme; cousin and husband of Lise Mouche; father of Jules and Laure. He was a true son of the soil, knowing nothing of the world beyond the narrow district in which he was born, and possessing that fierce passion for the land which is the characteristic of so many peasants.
- Chédeville, De - deputy for Eure-et-Loir under the Empire. He was an old beau who had flourished in the reign of Louis Philippe. His political career was cut short by a scandal which gave offense at the Tuileries, and he was defeated by Rochefontaine, who was nominated by Government as the official candidate.
- Cognet, Jacqueline, alias La Cognette - daughter of Cognet. She went to La Borderie at the age of twelve years, and before long had several lovers. She made her fortune, however, by resisting her master, Alexandre Hourdequin, for six months, and when she ultimately became his mistress she had made her position so secure that he was afterwards unable to part with her.
- Delhomme - was the son-in-law of Père Fouan, whose daughter Fanny he married. He was the owner of a small farm, which he managed so well that he became one of the richest of the peasant proprietors at Rognes.
- Delhomme, Madame, also known as Fanny Fouan - wife of Delhomme. At first kind, she became hardened, and eventually the cleanliness of her house became a mania with her.
- Fouan, Hyacinthe, also known as Jesus Christ - the elder son of Père Fouan and Rose Maliverne, his wife. He was an idler and drunkard, who, when he had left the army, after having seen service in Africa, had taken to tramp the fields, refusing to do any regular work, but living by theft and poaching, as though he were still looting a trembling nation of Bedouins.
- Fouan, Joseph Casimir - the father of Marianne, Louis, Michel, and Laure. Born in 1766, he belonged to a family of peasant proprietors which for centuries had owned land, in varying quantities, in the neighborhood of Rognes. They were originally serfs of the Roques-Bouqucval family. Bit by bit they acquired their land, until, when the Revolution of 1789 arrived, the Fouan of that day, Joseph Casimir, was the owner of twenty-one acres — the conquest of four centuries from the seigneurial territory. When, in 1793, the rest of the estate was declared national property and sold in lots by auction, he was too timid to purchase any, and had the mortification to see La Borderie sold to Isidore Hourdequin, a citizen of Chateaudun, for a fifth of its value. When he became old he divided his twenty-one acres between three of his family, Marianne, Louis, and Michel, and gave a corresponding sum of money to his younger daughter Laure, who had been brought up as a seamstress and was in service at Chateaudun.
- Fouan, Laure - younger daughter of the preceding. See Madame Charles Badeuil.
- Fouan, Louis - known as Père Fouan. He was the son of Joseph Casimir Fouan, and married Rose Maliverne, by whom he had three children, Hyacinthe, Buteau, and Fanny. He received seven acres of land from his father, and his wife brought him twelve acres more. This land he cultivated well, and with a passion for the soil, as such, which amounted to frenzy. It alone had his love, and his wife and children trembled before him under a rude despotism. At seventy years of age he was still healthy, but his limbs were failing, and he reluctantly decided to divide his land between his children. He retained his house and garden, which had come to him with his wife, and his family undertook to pay him a rent for the land handed over to them. Upon this along with a nest-egg of three hundred francs per annum, known to no one, the old people would be able to live comfortably.
- Fouan, Madame Rose - wife of Père Fouan and mother of Hyacinthe, Buteau, and Fanny. She worked hard on the farm, rising first and going to bed last.
- Fouan, Olympe, also known as La Trouille - daughter of Hyacinthe. Her mother, who was a tramp, ran off when the child was three years old, leaving her to grow up as best she could. She was passionately fond of geese, of which she had a large flock.
- Godard, the abbé of the parish of Rognes. He is frustrated over the administration's neglect of his parish and the respectless attitude of the villagers, and his work ethic boils down to the emotional state he is in.
- Grande, La - sobriquet of Marianne Fouan, elder daughter of Joseph Casimir Fouan, and sister of Père Fouan, Michel Mouche, and Laure Badeuil. She treats her relatives severely and is exceptionally stingy, even to the point of starving her chickens.
- Hourdequin, Alexandre - born 1804, was the only son of Isidore Hourdequien. He studied at the college of Chateaudun, but made little progress, as his only interest was in farming, for which he had an absolute passion. On the death of his father he became master of La Borderie, which he cultivated on the latest principles of agriculture, spending large sums upon it. He married a sister of Bailliehache, the notary, who brought him a considerable sum, which also went into the land. His wife died in a few years, leaving him with two children, a son named Leon, who to his great disappointment became a soldier, and a daughter who died young. In spite of these misfortunes he retained all his passion for the land, and in it he gradually sunk all his fortune, getting little from it in return. A liaison with Jacqueline Cognet, followed, and she gradually acquired complete influence over him.
- Hourdequin, Leon - son of Alexandre Hourdequin. He had an intense hatred of the soil and became a soldier, being promoted Captain after Solferino. He did not visit his home more than once a year, and was much annoyed to discover the liaison between his father and Jacqueline Cognet.
- Lequeu - a schoolmaster, who is severe and abuses his pupils, but underneath nurtures progressive ideas in favor of free trade and covets Macqueron's daughter, Berthe.
- Lengaigne - a dealer in tobacco and tavern-keeper at Rognes. He cultivated a small piece of land, while his wife weighed tobacco and looked after the cellar. He also shaved and cut the hair of the village. He has a wife, a daughter Suzanne and a son Victor.
- Macquart, Jean - born 1831, son of Antoine Macquart, was apprenticed to a carpenter. A quiet, industrious lad, Jean's father took advantage of his simple nature and made him give up his whole earnings to assist in keeping him in idleness. Like his sister Gervaise, he ran off soon after the death of his mother (see La Fortune des Rougon). He entered the army, and, after seven years of soldiering was discharged in 1859. When he had left the ranks he turned up at Bazoches-le-Doyen with a comrade, a joiner like himself; and he resumed his occupation with the latter's father, a master carpenter in the village. But his heart was no longer in his work, and having been sent to La Borderie to make some repairs, he stayed on to assist at the harvest, and eventually became a regular farm servant. He was not popular, however, with the peasants, who resented his having had a trade before he came back to the soil. He became acquainted at Rognes with Mouche and his daughters, Lise and Françoise, and eventually married the latter, in spite of the determined opposition of her brother-in-law, Buteau. Notwithstanding his marriage, he remained a stranger, and, after the death of his wife, went away, leaving everything in the hands of her relatives. The war with Prussia had just broken out, and Jean, disgusted with his life, again enlisted in the service of his country. (see further story in La Débâcle and Le Docteur Pascal).
- Macqueron - a grocer and tavern-keeper at Rognes. He was a municipal councilor, and deputy Mayor. Having succeeded in undermining Hourdequin's position as Mayor, Macqueron succeeded him. His wife is Coelina and has a daughter Berthe.
- Mouche, Le Père - the nickname of Michel Fouan, the third son of Joseph Casimir Fouan, and brother of La Grande, Père Fouan, and Laure Badeuil. When his father's estate was divided, he received the family dwelling house and some land, but was dissatisfied with his share and continued to accuse his brother and sister, though forty years had elapsed, of having robbed him when the lots were drawn.
- Mouche, Françoise - youngest daughter of Michel Fouan, alias Mouche. Her mother died early, and she was brought up by her sister Lise, to whom she was devotedly attached. She had a passion for justice, and when she had said "that is mine and that is yours", she would have been prepared to go to the stake in support of her rights.
- Mouche, Lise - elder daughter of Père Mouche, and sister of the preceding. She had a son to her cousin Buteau, who, however, did not marry her for three years afterwards, when the death of her father made her heiress to some land.
- Rochefontaine - proprietor of a large factory at Chateaudun. He was desirous of serving as a Deputy, but did not secure the support of the Government, and, standing as an independent candidate, was defeated. Later, in consequence of the disgrace of M. de Chedeville, he became the official candidate, and in spite of a brusqueness which made him unpopular, he was elected.
- Soulas - an old shepherd at La Borderie, where he had been for half a century. At sixty-five he had saved nothing, having been eaten up by a drunken wife, "whom at last he had the pleasure of burying." He had few friends except his two dogs, Emperor and Massacre, and he especially hated Jacqueline Cognet.

== Major themes ==
In this novel, Zola attempted to show some of the consequences of the division of rural estates in nineteenth-century France. The laws which provided for this, which were enshrined in the Civil Code of 1804 but owed their initiative to the Revolution, were extremely controversial throughout the 19th century. La Terre picks up on a number of contemporaneous obsessions regarding the decline of France under the influence of the Civil Code, including lack of respect for father figures (hence the patricide which concludes the novel) and voluntary sterility to avoid excessive division of estates between numerous heirs (hence the infamous scene of "onanism", in which Françoise and Jean practise coitus interruptus to avoid conceiving a child).

But the novel also deals with more timeless themes: the parallel with the story of Shakespeare's King Lear emphasises the horror of aging and the physical and mental reduction which accompanies it. Above all, the story plays upon the cyclical nature of life and death, contrasting the unending passage of the seasons with the trivial strife of mankind, a contrast encapsulated in the novel's final sentence: "Deaths, seed, and the bread grew out of the earth" ("Des morts, des semences, et le pain poussait de la terre").

== Literary significance ==
Zola's novel is one of the most graphically violent and, to a lesser extent, sexually explicit novels of the nineteenth century, and caused considerable controversy at the time of its publication. In it, Zola's efforts to expose the unpleasant underside of his contemporary society reached its apogee; none of the other Rougon-Macquart novels features such sensational material. The publication of an English translation of La Terre in 1888 led to the prosecution for obscenity of the publisher, Henry Vizetelly. The definitive critical study of La Terre remains Guy Robert's "La Terre" d'Émile Zola (Paris: Les Belles Lettres, 1952); there is little anglophone material published on the novel. The translator Ann Lindsay completed a translation of the novel into English in the 1950s shortly before she died.

== English Translations ==
=== Expurgated ===
1. The Soil (c. 1888, tr. G. D. Cox, T. B. Peterson & Bros.)
2. The Soil (1888, tr. unknown for E. A. Vizetelly, Vizetelly & Co.)

=== Unexpurgated ===
1. La Terre (1895, tr. Ernest Dowson, Lutetian Society)
2. Earth (1954, tr. Ann Lindsay, Elek Books)
3. Earth (1962, tr. Margaret Crosland, New English Library)
4. The Earth (1980, tr. Douglas Parmee, Penguin Books)
5. Earth (2016, tr. Brian Nelson and Julie Rose, Oxford University Press)

== Adaptations ==
La Terre has had the following adaptations:

- La Terre (1921), a silent movie shot in rural locations, directed by André Antoine and starring Armand Bour
- Wouja'e Trabe (2005), a 30-episode Moroccan television series created by Chafik Shimi, which aired on 2M TV
