= Émile Zola =

French writer (1840–1902)

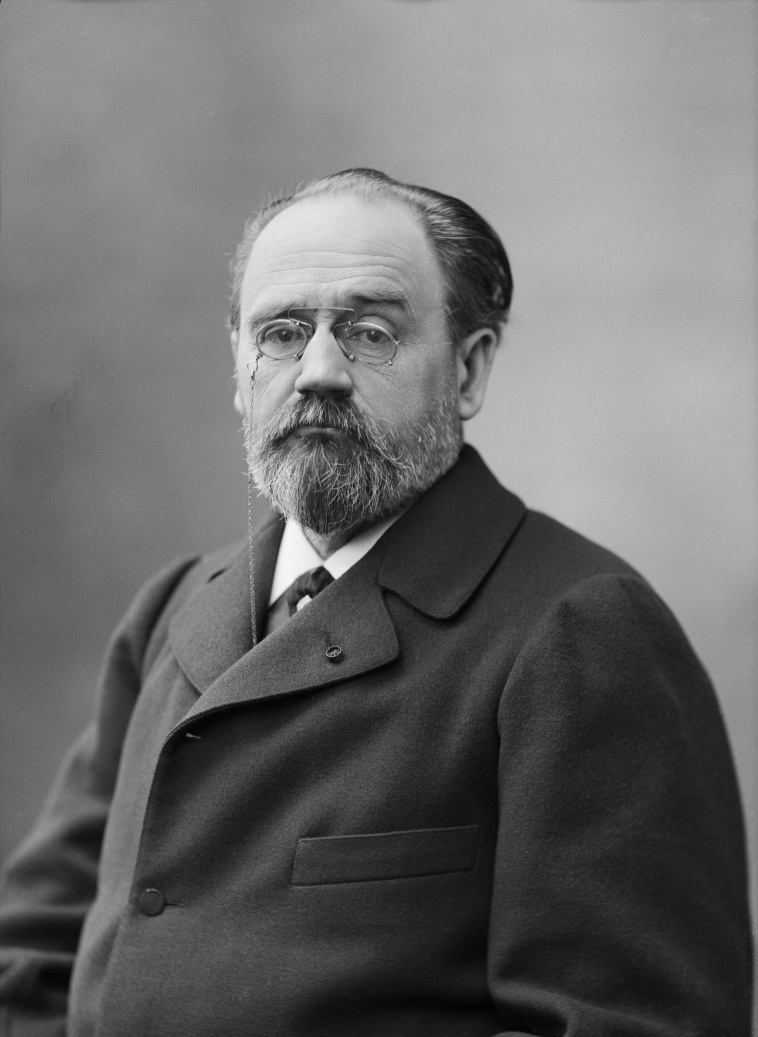
- Zola in 1898
- Born: Émile Édouard Charles Antoine Zola; 2 April 1840; Paris, France
- Died: 29 September 1902 (aged 62); Paris, France
- Resting place: Panthéon, Paris
- Occupations: Novelist; journalist; playwright; poet
- Spouse: Éléonore-Alexandrine Meley
- Parents: François Zola (father); Émilie Aubert (mother)
- Writing career
- Genres: Novel; short story
- Notable works: Les Rougon-Macquart, Thérèse Raquin, Madeleine Férat, Germinal
- Movement: Naturalism

Émile Édouard Charles Antoine Zola (/ˈzoʊlə/, also US: /zoʊˈlɑː/; French: [emil zɔla]; 2 April 1840 – 29 September 1902) was a French novelist, journalist, playwright, the best-known practitioner of the literary school of naturalism, and an important contributor to the development of theatrical naturalism. He was a major figure in the political liberalization of France and in the exoneration of the falsely accused and convicted army officer Alfred Dreyfus, which is encapsulated in his renowned newspaper opinion headlined J'Accuse...! Zola was nominated for the first and second Nobel Prizes in Literature in 1901 and 1902.

== Early life ==
Zola was born in Paris in 1840 to François Zola (originally Francesco Zolla) and Émilie Aubert. His father was an Italian engineer (Note: Hemmings. p.1835.) with some Greek ancestry, who was born in Venice in 1795, and engineered the Zola Dam in Aix-en-Provence; his mother was French. The family moved to Aix-en-Provence in the southeast when Émile was three years old. In 1845, five-year-old Zola was sexually molested by an older boy. Two years later, in 1847, his father died, leaving his mother on a meager pension. In 1852, Zola entered the Collège Bourbon as a boarding student. He would later complain about poor nutrition and bullying in school.

In 1858, the Zolas moved to Paris, where Émile's childhood friend Paul Cézanne soon joined him. Zola started to write in the Romantic style. His widowed mother had planned a law career for Émile, but he failed his baccalauréat examination twice.

Before his breakthrough as a writer, Zola worked for minimal pay as a clerk in a shipping firm and then in the sales department for the publisher Hachette. He also wrote literary and art reviews for newspapers. As a political journalist, Zola did not hide his dislike of Napoleon III, who had successfully run for the office of president under the constitution of the French Second Republic, only to use this position as a springboard for the coup d'état that made him emperor.

== Later life ==
In 1862 Zola was naturalized as a French citizen. In 1865, he met Éléonore-Alexandrine Meley, who called herself Gabrielle, a seamstress. They married on 31 May 1870. Together they cared for Zola's mother. She stayed with him all his life and was instrumental in promoting his work. The marriage remained childless. Alexandrine Zola had had a child before she met Zola that she had given up, because she had been unable to take care of it. When she confessed this to Zola after their marriage, they went looking for the girl, but she had died a short time after birth.

In 1888, he was given a camera, but he only began to use it in 1895 and attained a near professional level of expertise. Also in 1888, Alexandrine hired Jeanne Rozerot, a 21-year-old seamstress who was to live with them in their home in Médan. The 48-year-old Zola fell in love with Jeanne and fathered two children with her: Denise in 1889 and Jacques in 1891. After Jeanne left Médan for Paris, Zola continued to support and visit her and their children. In November 1891 Alexandrine discovered the affair, but their marriage lasted until Zola's death. The discord was partially healed, which allowed Zola to take an increasingly active role in the lives of the children. After Zola's death, the children were given his name as their lawful surname.

== Career ==
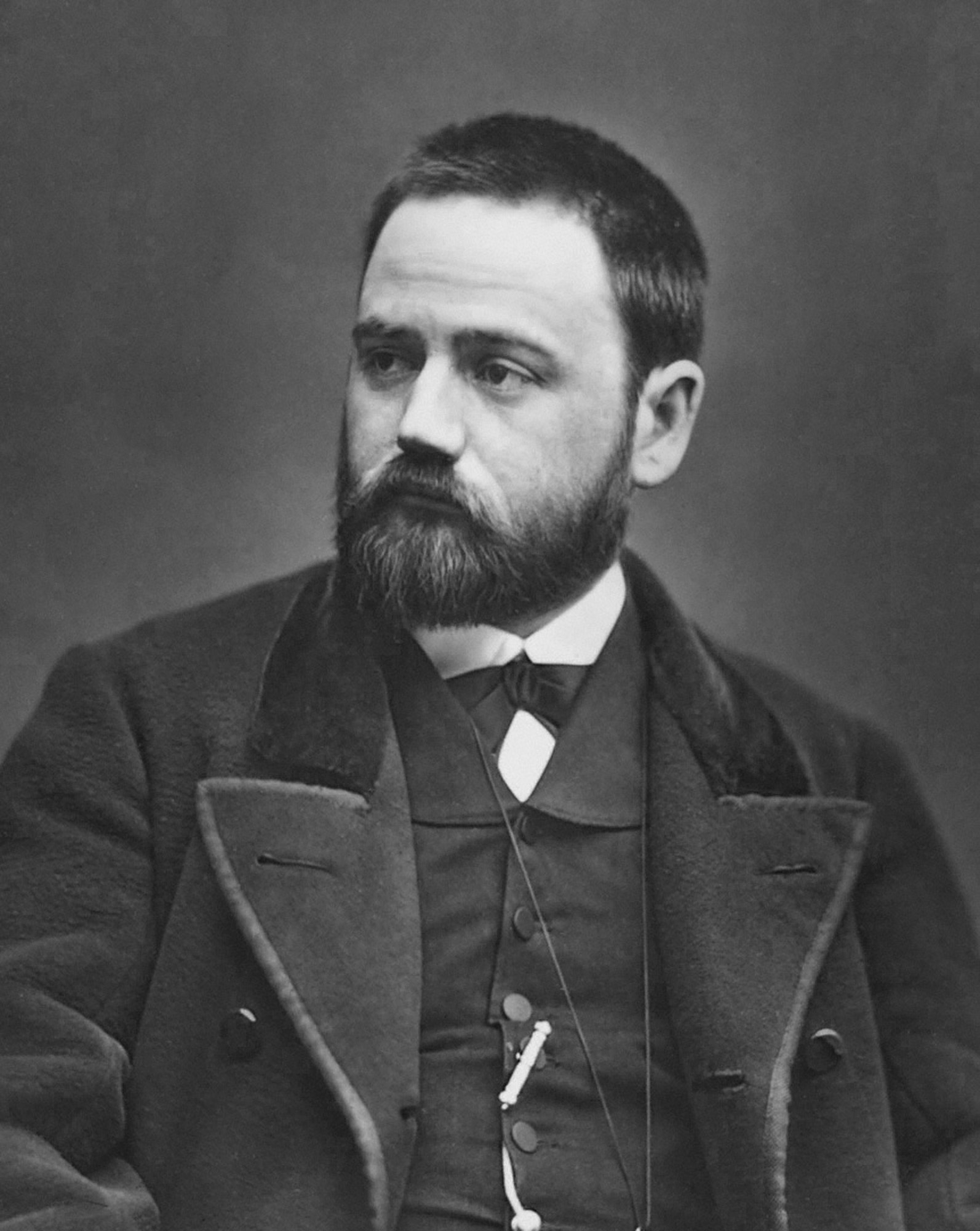
Zola early in his career, c. 1865.

During his early years, Zola wrote numerous short stories and essays, four plays, and three novels. Among his early books was Contes à Ninon ("Stories for Ninon"), published in 1864. With the publication of his sordid autobiographical novel La Confession de Claude (1865) attracting police attention, Hachette fired Zola. His novel Les Mystères de Marseille appeared as a serial in 1867. He was also an aggressive critic, his articles on literature and art appearing in Villemessant's journal L'Événement. After his first major novel, Thérèse Raquin (1867), Zola started the series called Les Rougon-Macquart.

In Paris, Zola maintained his friendship with Cézanne, who painted a portrait of him with another friend from Aix-en-Provence, writer Paul Alexis, entitled Paul Alexis Reading to Zola.

=== Literary output ===
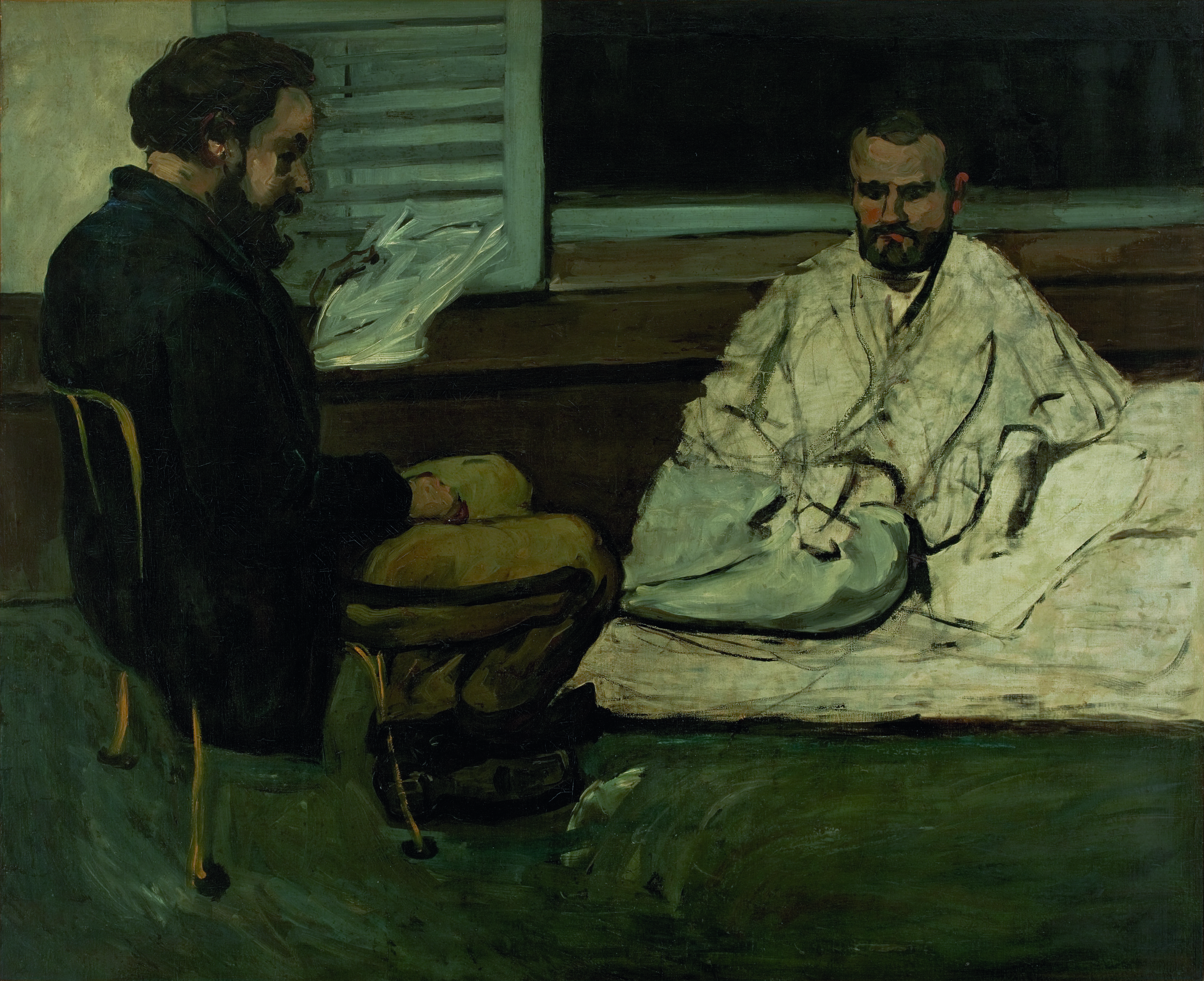
Paul Cézanne, Paul Alexis Reading to Émile Zola, 1869–1870, São Paulo Museum of Art

More than half of Zola's novels were part of the twenty-volume Les Rougon-Macquart cycle, which details the history of a single family under the reign of Napoléon III. Unlike Balzac, who in the midst of his literary career resynthesized his work into La Comédie Humaine, Zola from the start, at the age of 28, had thought of the complete layout of the series. Set in France's Second Empire, in the context of Baron Haussmann's changing Paris, the series traces the environmental and hereditary influences of violence, alcohol, and prostitution which became more prevalent during the second wave of the Industrial Revolution. The series examines two branches of the family—the respectable (that is, legitimate) Rougons and the disreputable (illegitimate) Macquarts—over five generations.

In the preface to the first novel of the series, Zola states, "I want to explain how a family, a small group of regular people, behaves in society, while expanding through the birth of ten, twenty individuals, who seem at first glance profoundly dissimilar, but who are shown through analysis to be intimately linked to one another. Heredity has its own laws, just like gravity. I will attempt to find and to follow, by resolving the double question of temperaments and environments, the thread that leads mathematically from one man to another."

Although Zola and Cézanne were friends from childhood, they experienced a falling out later in life over Zola's fictionalised depiction of Cézanne and the Bohemian life of painters in Zola's novel L'Œuvre (The Masterpiece, 1886).

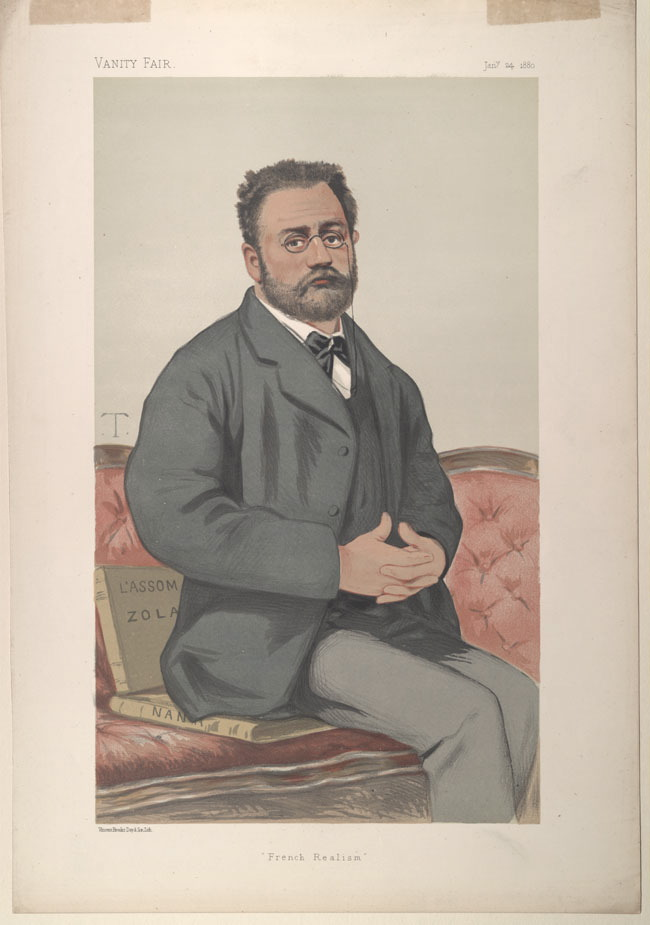
Captioned "French Realism", caricature of Zola in the London magazine Vanity Fair, 1880

From 1877, with the publication of L'Assommoir, Émile Zola became wealthy; he was better paid than Victor Hugo, for example. Because L'Assommoir was such a success, Zola was able to renegotiate his contract with his publisher Georges Charpentier to receive more than 14% royalties and the exclusive rights to serial publication in the press. Subsequently, sales of L'Assommoir were even exceeded by those of Nana (1880) and La Débâcle (1892). He became a figurehead among the literary bourgeoisie and organised cultural dinners with Guy de Maupassant, Joris-Karl Huysmans, and other writers at his luxurious villa (worth 300,000 francs) in Médan, near Paris, after 1880. Despite being nominated several times, Zola was never elected to the Académie française.

Zola's output also included novels on population (Fécondité) and work (Travail), a number of plays, and several volumes of criticism. He wrote every day for around 30 years, and took as his motto Nulla dies sine linea ("not a day without a line").

The self-proclaimed leader of French naturalism, Zola's works inspired operas such as those of Gustave Charpentier, notably Louise in the 1890s. His works were inspired by the concept of heredity and milieu (Claude Bernard and Hippolyte Taine) and by the realism of Balzac and Flaubert. He also provided the libretto for several operas by Alfred Bruneau, including Messidor (1897) and L'Ouragan (1901); several of Bruneau's other operas are adapted from Zola's writing. These provided a French alternative to Italian verismo.

He is considered to be a significant influence on those writers that are credited with the creation of the so-called new journalism: Wolfe, Capote, Thompson, Mailer, Didion, Talese and others. Tom Wolfe wrote that his goal in writing fiction was to document contemporary society in the tradition of John Steinbeck, Charles Dickens, and Émile Zola.

== Dreyfus affair ==
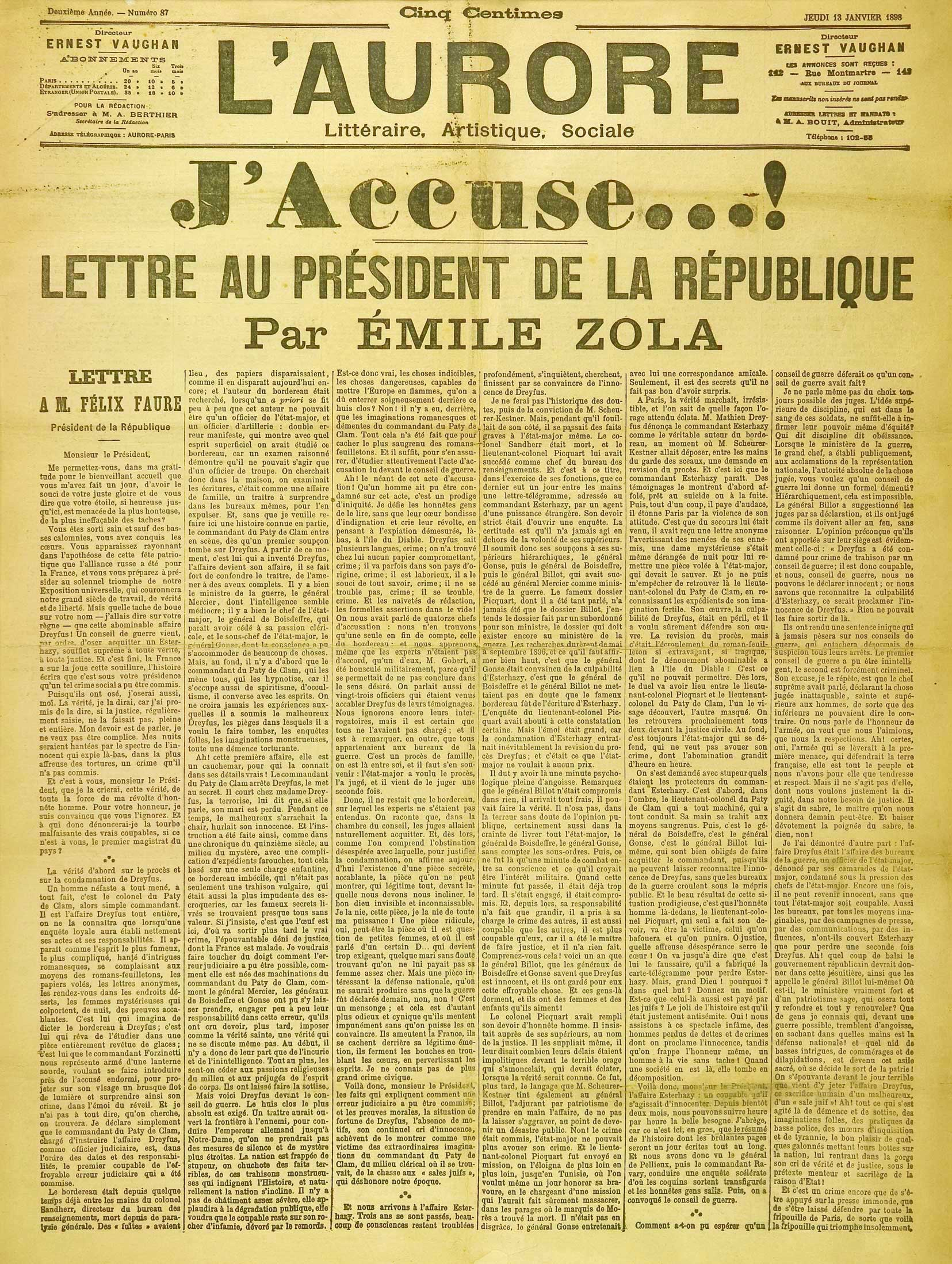
Front page cover of the newspaper L'Aurore for Thursday 13 January 1898, with the open letter J'Accuse...!, written by Émile Zola about the Dreyfus affair. The headline reads "I Accuse...! Letter to the President of the Republic"—Paris Museum of Jewish Art and History

Captain Alfred Dreyfus was a French-Jewish artillery officer in the French army. In September 1894, French intelligence discovered someone had been passing military secrets to the German Embassy. Senior officers began to suspect Dreyfus, though there was no direct evidence of any wrongdoing. Dreyfus was court-martialed, convicted of treason, and sent to Devil's Island in French Guiana.

Lt. Col. Georges Picquart came across evidence that implicated another officer, Ferdinand Walsin Esterhazy, and informed his superiors. Rather than move to clear Dreyfus, the decision was made to protect Esterhazy and ensure the original verdict was not overturned. Major Hubert-Joseph Henry forged documents that made it seem as if Dreyfus were guilty, while Picquart was reassigned to duty in Africa. However, Picquart's findings were communicated by his lawyer to the Senator Auguste Scheurer-Kestner, who took up the case, at first discreetly and then increasingly publicly. Meanwhile, further evidence was brought forward by Dreyfus's family and Esterhazy's estranged family and creditors. Under pressure, the general staff arranged for a closed court-martial to be held on 10–11 January 1898, at which Esterhazy was tried in camera and acquitted. Picquart was detained on charges of violation of professional secrecy.

In response Zola risked his career and more, and on 13 January 1898 published J'Accuse...! on the front page of the Paris daily L'Aurore. The newspaper was run by Ernest Vaughan and Georges Clemenceau, who decided that the controversial story would be in the form of an open letter to the president, Félix Faure. Zola's J'Accuse...! accused the highest levels of the French Army of obstruction of justice and antisemitism by having wrongfully convicted Alfred Dreyfus to life imprisonment on Devil's Island in French Guiana. Zola's intention was that he be prosecuted for libel so that the new evidence in support of Dreyfus would be made public.

The case, known as the Dreyfus affair, deeply divided France between the reactionary army and Catholic Church on one hand, and the more liberal commercial society on the other. The ramifications continued for many years; on the 100th anniversary of Zola's article, France's Catholic daily paper, La Croix, apologised for its antisemitic editorials during the Dreyfus affair. As a leading French thinker and public figure, his open letter J’Accuse had a significant impact, contributing to the reopening of the case and ultimately the pardon of Alfred Dreyfus.

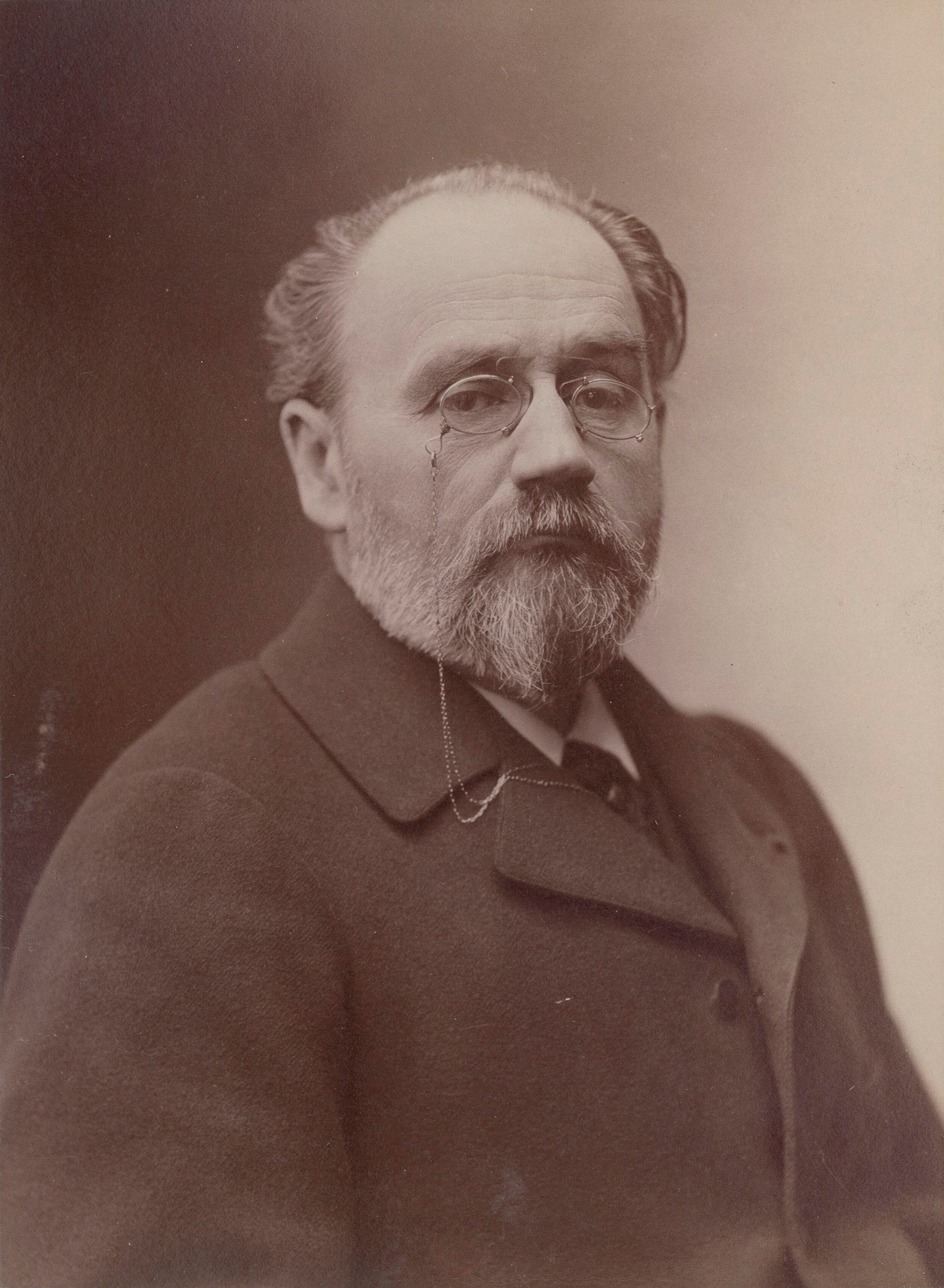
Zola c. 1896

Zola was brought to trial for criminal libel on 7 February 1898, and was convicted on 23 February and removed from the Legion of Honour. The first judgment was overturned in April on a technicality, but a new suit was pressed against Zola, which opened on 18 July. At his lawyer's advice, Zola fled to England rather than wait for the end of the trial (at which he was again convicted). Without even having had the time to pack a few clothes, he arrived at Victoria Station on 19 July, the start of a brief and unhappy residence in the UK. Zola wrote a book about his exile in England: Pages d'exil (Notes from Exile).

Zola visited historic locations including a Church of England service at Westminster Abbey. After initially staying at the Grosvenor Hotel, Victoria, Zola went to the Oatlands Park Hotel in Weybridge and shortly afterwards rented a house locally called Penn where he was joined by his family for the summer. At the end of August, they moved to another house in Addlestone called Summerfield. In early October the family moved to London and then his wife and children went back to France so the children could resume their schooling. Thereafter Zola lived alone in the Queen's Hotel, Norwood. He stayed in Upper Norwood from October 1898 to June 1899.

In France, the furious divisions over the Dreyfus affair continued. The fact of Major Henry's forgery was discovered and admitted to in August 1898, and the Government referred Dreyfus's original court-martial to the Supreme Court for review the following month, over the objections of the General Staff. Eight months later, on 3 June 1899, the Supreme Court annulled the original verdict and ordered a new military court-martial. The same month Zola returned from his exile in England. Still the anti-Dreyfusards would not give up, and on 9 September 1899 Dreyfus was again convicted.

Dreyfus applied for a retrial, but the government countered by offering Dreyfus a pardon (rather than exoneration), which would allow him to go free, provided that he admit to being guilty. Although he was clearly not guilty, he chose to accept the pardon. Later the same month, despite Zola's condemnation, an amnesty bill was passed, covering "all criminal acts or misdemeanours related to the Dreyfus affair or that have been included in a prosecution for one of these acts", indemnifying Zola and Picquart, but also all those who had concocted evidence against Dreyfus. Dreyfus was finally completely exonerated by the Supreme Court in 1906.

Zola said of the affair, "The truth is on the march, and nothing shall stop it." Zola's 1898 article is widely viewed in France as the most prominent manifestation of the new power of the intellectuals (writers, artists, academicians) in shaping public opinion, the media and the state.

== The Manifesto of the Five ==
On 18 August 1887, the French daily newspaper Le Figaro published "The Manifesto of the Five" shortly after La Terre was released. The signatories included Paul Bonnetain, J. H. Rosny, Lucien Descaves, Paul Margueritte and Gustave Guiches, who strongly disapproved of the lack of balance of both morals and aesthetics throughout the book's depiction of the revolution. The manifesto accused Zola of having "lowered the standard of Naturalism, of catering to large sales by deliberate obscenities, of being a morbid and impotent hypochondriac, incapable of taking a sane and healthy view of mankind. They freely referred to Zola's physiological weaknesses and expressed the utmost horror at the crudeness of La Terre."

== Death ==
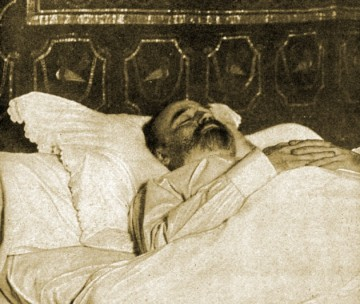
Zola on his deathbed

Zola died on 29 September 1902 of carbon monoxide poisoning caused by an improperly ventilated chimney. His funeral on 5 October was attended by thousands. Alfred Dreyfus initially had promised not to attend the funeral, but was given permission by Zola's widow and attended. At the time of his death Zola had just completed a novel, Vérité, about the Dreyfus trial. A sequel, Justice, had been planned, but was not completed.

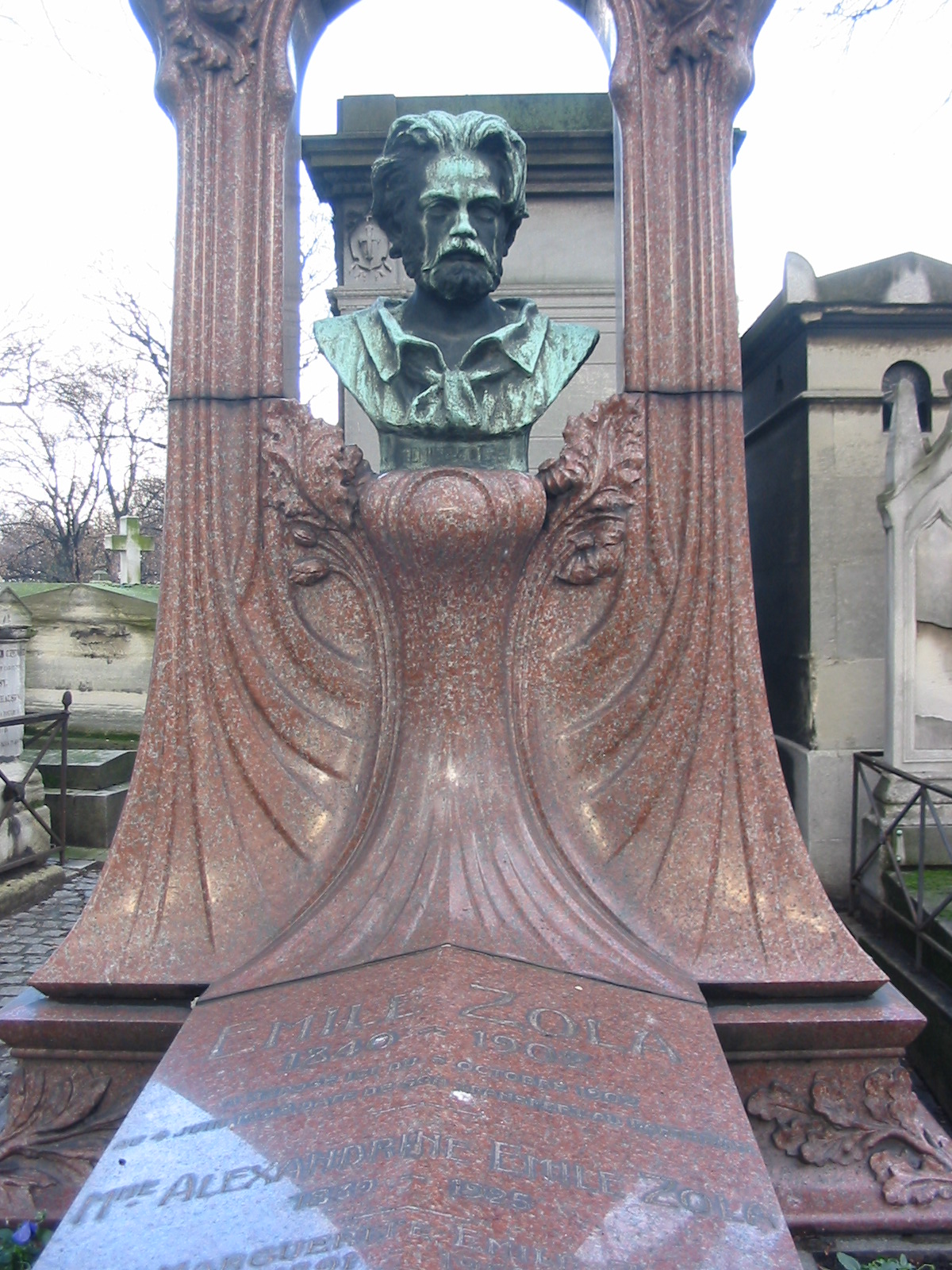
Gravestone of Émile Zola at cimetière Montmartre; his remains are now interred in the Panthéon.

His enemies were blamed for his death because of previous attempts on his life, but nothing could be proven at the time. Expressions of sympathy arrived from everywhere in France; for a week the vestibule of his house was crowded with notable writers, scientists, artists, and politicians who came to inscribe their names in the registers. On the other hand, Zola's enemies used the opportunity to celebrate in malicious glee. Writing in L'Intransigeant, Henri Rochefort claimed Zola had committed suicide, having discovered Dreyfus to be guilty.

Zola was initially buried in the Cimetière de Montmartre in Paris, but on 4 June 1908, just five years and nine months after his death, his remains were relocated to the Panthéon, where he shares a crypt with Victor Hugo and Alexandre Dumas. The ceremony was disrupted by an assassination attempt on Alfred Dreyfus by Louis Grégori, a disgruntled journalist and admirer of Édouard Drumont, in which Dreyfus was wounded in the arm by the gunshot. Grégori was acquitted by the Parisian court which accepted his defense that he had not meant to kill Dreyfus, meaning merely to graze him.

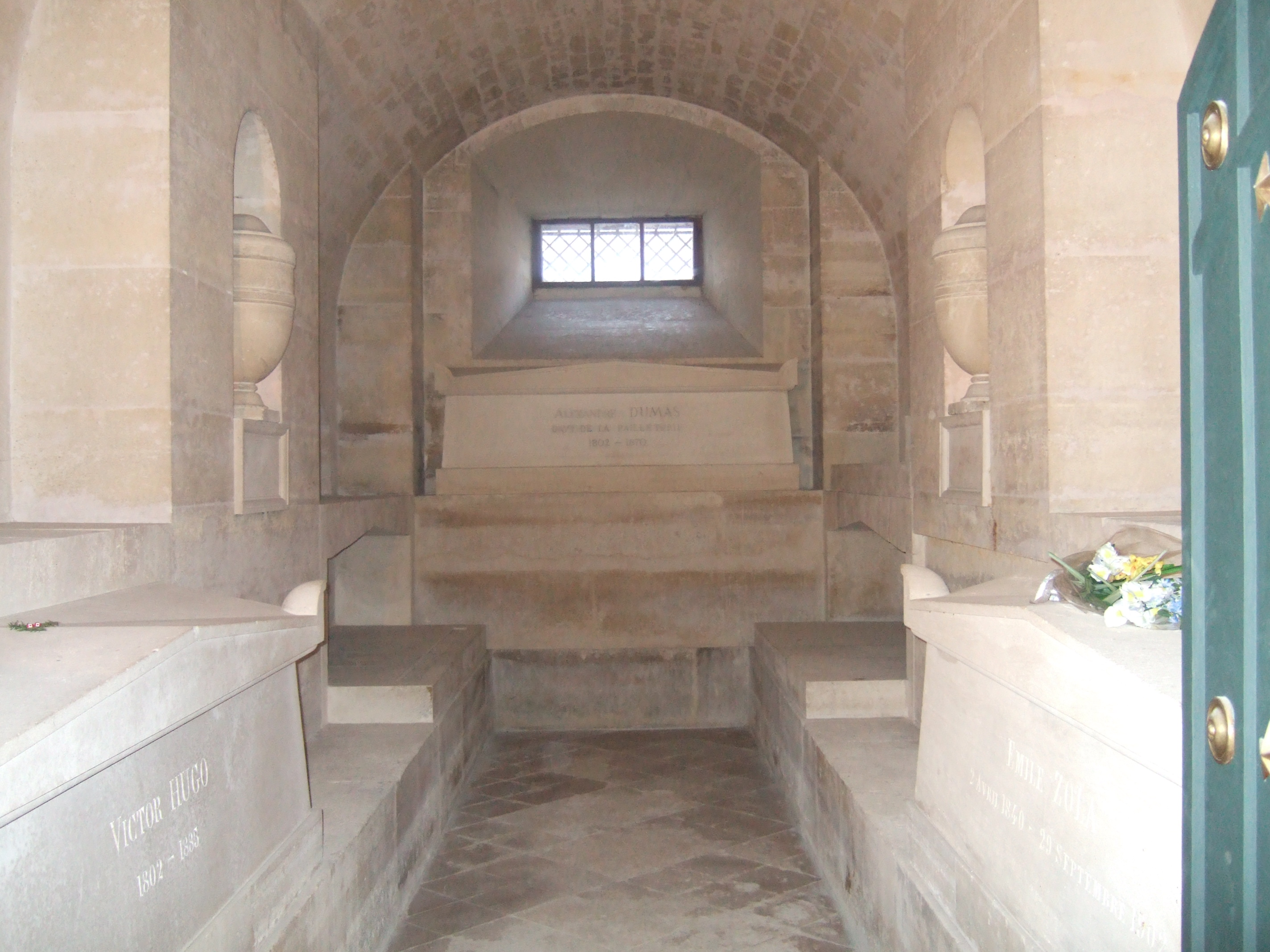
Graves of Alexandre Dumas, Victor Hugo and Émile Zola at the Panthéon in Paris

A 1953 investigation by journalist Jean Bedel published in the newspaper Libération under the headline "Was Zola assassinated?" raised the idea that Zola's death might have been a murder rather than an accident. It is based on the revelation by Norman pharmacist Pierre Hacquin, who was told by chimney-sweep Henri Buronfosse that he intentionally blocked the chimney of Zola's apartment in Paris. Literary historian Alain Pagès believes that is likely true and Zola's great-granddaughters, Brigitte Émile-Zola and Martine Le Blond-Zola, corroborate this explanation of Zola's poisoning by carbon monoxide. As reported in L'Orient-Le Jour, Brigitte Émile-Zola recounts that her grandfather Jacques Émile-Zola, son of Émile Zola, told her at the age of eight that, in 1952, a man came to his house to give him information about his father's death. The man had been with a dying friend, who had confessed to taking money to plug Emile Zola's chimney.

== Scope of the Rougon-Macquart series ==
Zola's Rougon-Macquart novels are a panoramic account of the Second French Empire. They tell the story of a family approximately between the years 1851 and 1871. These twenty novels contain over 300 characters, who descend from the two family lines of the Rougons and Macquarts. In Zola's words, which are the subtitle of the Rougon-Macquart series, they are "L'Histoire naturelle et sociale d'une famille sous le Second Empire" ("The natural and social history of a family under the Second Empire").

Most of the Rougon-Macquart novels were written during the French Third Republic. To an extent, attitudes and value judgments may have been superimposed on that picture with the wisdom of hindsight. Some critics classify Zola's work, and naturalism more broadly, as a particular strain of decadent literature, which emphasized the fallen, corrupted state of modern civilization. Nowhere is the doom-laden image of the Second Empire so clearly seen as in Nana, which culminates in echoes of the Franco-Prussian War (and hence by implication of the French defeat). Even in novels dealing with earlier periods of Napoleon III's reign the picture of the Second Empire is sometimes overlaid with the imagery of catastrophe.

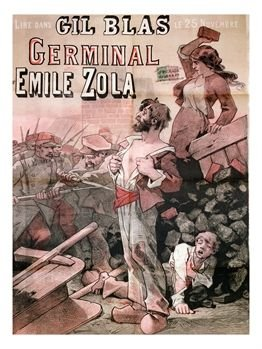
Poster by Léon Choubrac advertising the publication of Zola's novel Germinal in Gil Blas, 25 November 1884

In the Rougon-Macquart novels, provincial life can seem to be overshadowed by Zola's preoccupation with the capital. However, the following novels (see the individual titles in the Livre de poche series) scarcely touch on life in Paris: La Terre (peasant life in Beauce), Le Rêve (an unnamed cathedral city), Germinal (collieries in the northeast of France), La Joie de vivre (the Atlantic coast), and the four novels set in and around Plassans (modelled on his childhood home, Aix-en-Provence), (La Fortune des Rougon, La Conquête de Plassans, La Faute de l'Abbé Mouret and Le Docteur Pascal). La Débâcle, the military novel, is set for the most part in country districts of eastern France; its dénouement takes place in the capital during the civil war leading to the suppression of the Paris Commune. Though Paris has its role in La Bête humaine the most striking incidents (notably the train crash) take place elsewhere. Even the Paris-centred novels tend to set some scenes outside, if not very far from, the capital. In the political novel Son Excellence Eugène Rougon, the eponymous minister's interventions on behalf of his so-called friends, have their consequences elsewhere, and the reader is witness to some of them. Even Nana, one of Zola's characters most strongly associated with Paris, makes a brief and typically disastrous trip to the country.

== Quasi-scientific purpose ==
In Le Roman expérimental and Les Romanciers naturalistes, Zola expounded the purposes of the "naturalist" novel. The experimental novel was to serve as a vehicle for scientific experiment, analogous to the experiments conducted by Claude Bernard and expounded by him in Introduction à la médecine expérimentale. Claude Bernard's experiments were in the field of clinical physiology, those of the Naturalist writers (Zola being their leader) would be in the realm of psychology influenced by the natural environment. Balzac, Zola claimed, had already investigated the psychology of lechery in an experimental manner, in the figure of Hector Hulot in La Cousine Bette. Essential to Zola's concept of the experimental novel was dispassionate observation of the world, with all that it involved by way of meticulous documentation. To him, each novel should be based upon a dossier. With this aim, he visited the colliery of Anzin in northern France, in February 1884 when a strike was on; he visited La Beauce (for La Terre), Sedan, Ardennes (for La Débâcle) and travelled on the railway line between Paris and Le Havre (when researching La Bête humaine).

== Characterisation ==
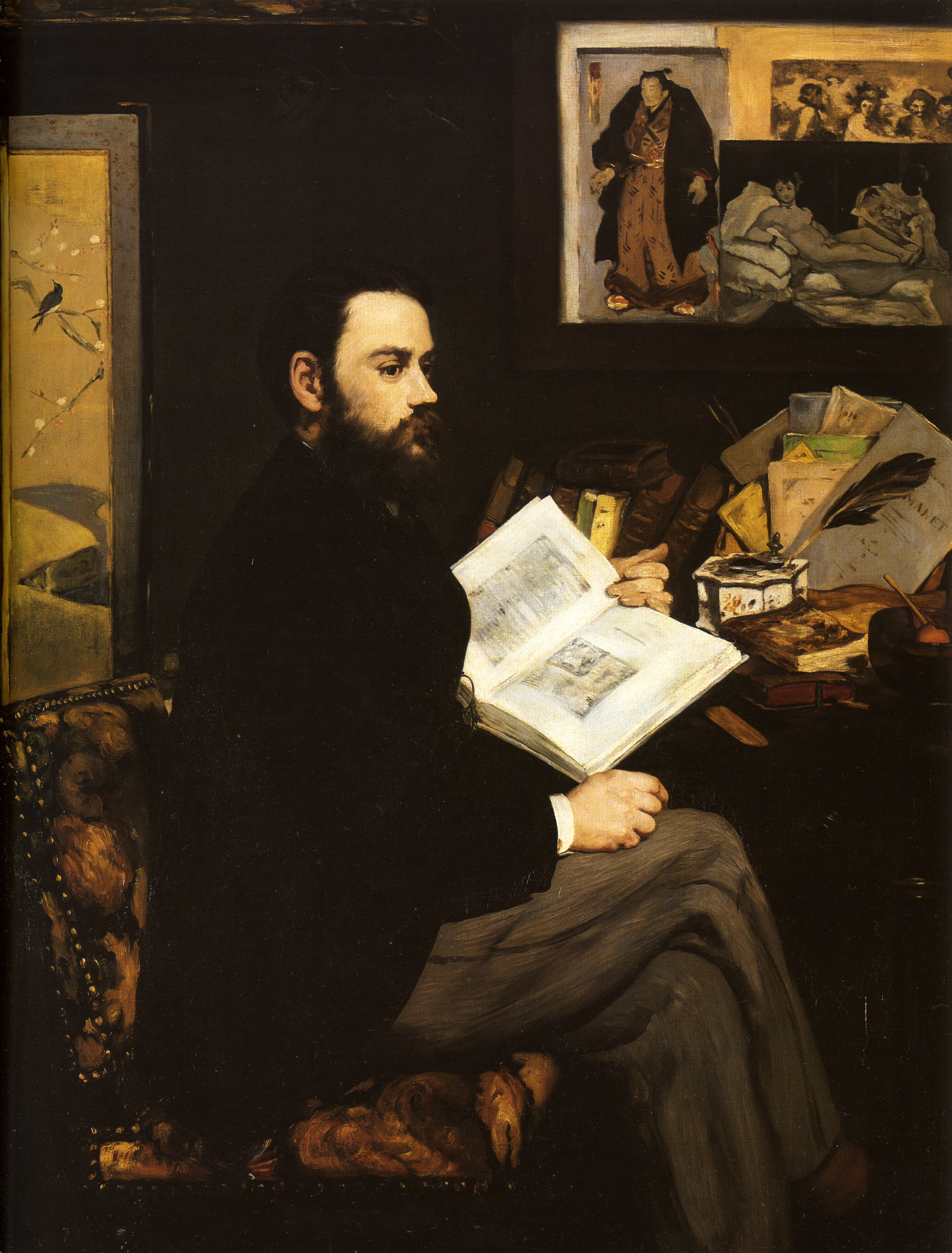
Édouard Manet, Portrait of Émile Zola, 1868, Musée d'Orsay

Zola strongly claimed that Naturalist literature is an experimental analysis of human psychology. Considering this claim, many critics, such as György Lukács, find Zola strangely poor at creating lifelike and memorable characters in the manner of Honoré de Balzac or Charles Dickens, despite his ability to evoke powerful crowd scenes. It was important to Zola that no character should appear larger than life; but the criticism that his characters are "cardboard" is substantially more damaging. Zola, by refusing to make any of his characters larger than life (if that is what he has indeed done), did not inhibit himself from also achieving verisimilitude.

Although Zola found it scientifically and artistically unjustifiable to create larger-than-life characters, his work presents some larger-than-life symbols which, like the mine Le Voreux in Germinal, take on the nature of a surrogate human life. The mine, the still in L'Assommoir and the locomotive La Lison in La Bête humaine impress the reader with the vivid reality of human beings. The great natural processes of seedtime and harvest, death and renewal in La Terre are instinct with a vitality which is not human but is the elemental energy of life. Human life is raised to the level of the mythical as the hammerblows of Titans are seemingly heard underground at Le Voreux, or as in La Faute de l'Abbé Mouret, the walled park of Le Paradou encloses a re-enactment—and restatement—of the Book of Genesis.

== Zola's optimism ==
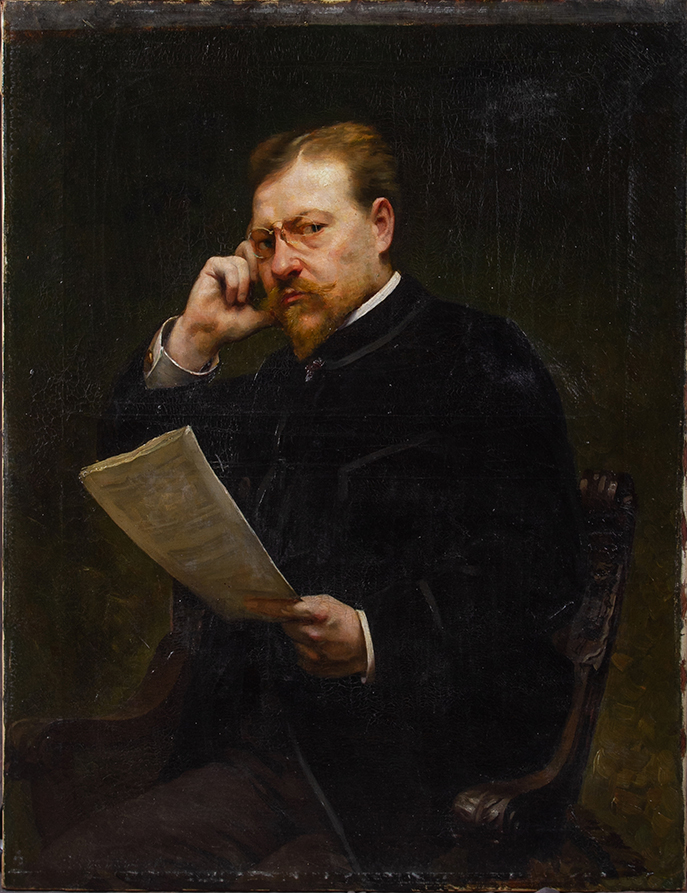
Luc Barbut-Davray, Portrait of Zola, oil on canvas, 1899

Zola combined elements of scientific analysis, poetry and literature into an optimistic outlook, and was an important proponent of positivism; later in his life, when he saw his own position turning into an anachronism, he would still style himself with irony and sadness over the lost cause as "an old and rugged Positivist".

His poetic output was comparable with the colourful impressionistic techniques of Claude Monet and Pierre-Auguste Renoir, as in the racecourse scene in Nana or in the descriptions of the laundry in L'Assommoir or in many passages of La Faute de l'Abbé Mouret, Le Ventre de Paris and La Curée. Zola was a believer in some measure of scientific determinism – not that this, despite his own words "devoid of free will" ("dépourvus de libre arbitre"), need always amount to a philosophical denial of free will. The creator of "la littérature putride", a term of abuse invented by an early critic of Thérèse Raquin (a novel which predates Les Rougon-Macquart series), emphasizes the squalid aspects of the human environment and upon the seamy side of human nature.

Zola's work displayed an optimistic belief in progress, both scientific and societal. Zola bases his optimism on innéité and on the supposed capacity of the human race to make progress in a moral sense. Innéité is defined by Zola as that process in which "se confondent les caractères physiques et moraux des parents, sans que rien d'eux semble s'y retrouver"; it is the term used in biology to describe the process where the moral and temperamental dispositions of some individuals are unaffected by the hereditary transmission of genetic characteristics.

== In popular culture ==
- The Life of Émile Zola (1937) is a well-received film biography, starring Paul Muni, which devotes significant footage to Zola's involvement in exonerating Dreyfus. The film won the Academy Award for Outstanding Production.
- Giannis Argyris played the role of Zola in the Greek melodrama Είμαι αθώος (translitteration: Ime Athoos, "I am innocent", 1960) directed by Dinos Katsouridis.
- Zola is known to have been an inspiration to Christopher Hitchens as found in his book Letters to a Young Contrarian (2001).
- The 2012 BBC TV series The Paradise is based on Zola's 1883 novel Au Bonheur des Dames.
- Cézanne et Moi (2016) is a French film, directed by Danièle Thompson, that explores the friendship between Zola and the Post-Impressionist painter Paul Cézanne.

== Bibliography ==
=== French language ===
- La Confession de Claude (1865)
- Les Mystères de Marseille (1867)
- Thérèse Raquin (1867)
- Madeleine Férat (1868)
- Nouveaux Contes à Ninon (1874)
- Le Roman Experimental (1880)
- Jacques Damour et autres nouvelles (1880)
- L'Attaque du moulin (1877), short story included in Les Soirées de Médan
- L'Inondation (The Flood) novella (1880)
- Les Rougon-Macquart
  - La Fortune des Rougon (1871)
  - La Curée (1871–72)
  - Le Ventre de Paris (1873)
  - La Conquête de Plassans (1874)
  - La Faute de l'Abbé Mouret (1875)
  - Son Excellence Eugène Rougon (1876)
  - L'Assommoir (1877)
  - Une page d'amour (1878)
  - Nana (1880)
  - Pot-Bouille (1882)
  - Au Bonheur des Dames (1883)
  - La joie de vivre (1884)
  - Germinal (1885)
  - L'Œuvre (1886)
  - La Terre (1887)
  - Le Rêve (1888)
  - La Bête humaine (1890)
  - L'Argent (1891)
  - La Débâcle (1892)
  - Le Docteur Pascal (1893)
- Les Trois Villes
  - Lourdes (1894)
  - Rome (1896)
  - Paris (1898)
- Les Quatre Évangiles
  - Fécondité (1899)
  - Travail (1901)
  - Vérité (1903, published posthumously)
  - Justice (unfinished)

=== Works translated into English ===
The Three Cities

1. Lourdes (1894)
2. Rome (1896)
3. Paris (1898)

The Four Gospels

1. Fruitfulness (1900)
2. Work (1901)
3. Truth (1903)
4. Justice (Unfinished)

Standalones

- The Mysteries of Marseilles (1895)
- The Fête at Coqueville (1907)

==== Modern translations ====
- Madeleine Férat (1957)
- The Attack on the Mill and Other Stories (1984)
- Thérèse Raquin (1992, 1995, and 2013)
- The Flood (2013)

The Rougon-Macquart (1993–2020)

1. The Fortune of the Rougons (2012)
2. His Excellency Eugène Rougon (2018)
3. The Kill (2004)
4. Money (2016)
5. The Dream (2018)
6. The Conquest of Plassans (2014)
7. Pot Luck (1999)
8. The Ladies Paradise (1995)
9. The Sin of Father Mouret (2017)
10. A Love Story (2017)
11. The Belly of Paris (2007)
12. The Bright Side of Life (2018)
13. The Drinking Den (1995)
14. The Masterpiece (1993)
15. The Beast Within (1999)
16. Germinal (1894)
17. Nana (2020)
18. The Earth (2016)
19. The Debacle (1972)
20. Doctor Pascal (2020)

== See also ==
- List of unsolved deaths
