= Le Tholonet =

Commune in Provence-Alpes-Côte d'Azur, France

- Commune
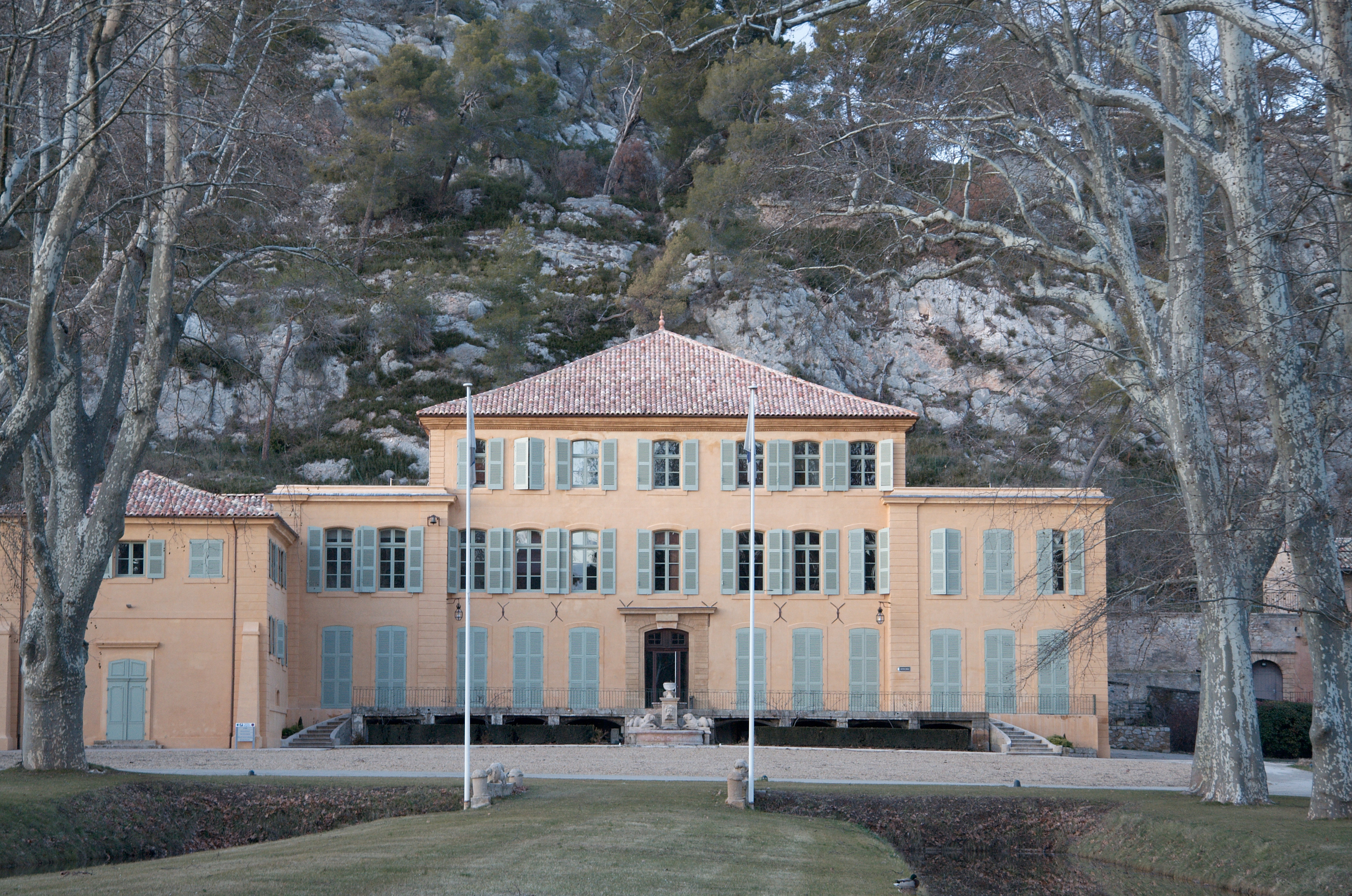
- Château du Tholonet

- Coat of arms
- Location of Le Tholonet
- Location within France Location within Provence-Alpes-Côte d'Azur
- Coordinates: 43°31′22″N 5°30′42″E
- Country: France
- Region: Provence-Alpes-Côte d'Azur
- Department: Bouches-du-Rhône
- Arrondissement: Aix-en-Provence
- Canton: Trets
- Intercommunality: Aix-Marseille-Provence

Government
  - Mayor (2026–32): Serge Mori
- Area^{1}: 10.82 km^{2} (4.18 sq mi)
- Elevation: 193 m (633 ft)
- Highest elevation: 350 m (1,150 ft)
- Lowest elevation: 150 m (490 ft)
- Population (2023): 2,391
  - Density: 221.0/km^{2} (572.3/sq mi)
- Time zone: UTC+01:00 (CET)
  - Summer (DST): UTC+02:00 (CEST)
- INSEE/Postal code: 13109 /13100
- ^{1} French Land Register data, which excludes lakes, ponds, glaciers > 1 km^{2} (0.386 sq mi or 247 acres) and river estuaries.

Le Tholonet (French pronunciation: [lə tɔlɔnɛ]; Lou Toulounet and Lo Tolonet in Provençal) is a commune in the Bouches-du-Rhône department in southern France. Its inhabitants are called Tholonétiens.

== Geography ==
The commune is near Aix-en-Provence, and at the foot of the montagne Sainte-Victoire. The river Arc goes through the commune.

The hamlet of Palette, which gives its name to the Palette AOC appellation, is located on the commune's territory.

== History ==
The earliest signs of human presence can be dated back to the Iron Age, and are located in the Infernet and Espinades ranges.

In the nineteenth century, a small oppidum named "Ragabom camp" or "Ratabom camp" was discovered at the Infernet site. The camp consists of fortifications build with large stone blocks. The ruins are barely discernible today. Archeological surveys done from 1979-1980 helped discover furnishings dated from the Iron Ages up to the 2nd century BC, a time when the site was highly populated.

== Population ==
Historical population

Year	Pop.	±% p.a.
1793	470	—
1800	350	−4.12%
1806	489	+5.73%
1821	465	−0.33%
1831	501	+0.75%
1836	514	+0.51%
1841	540	+0.99%
1846	504	−1.37%
1851	602	+3.62%
1856	546	−1.93%
1861	540	−0.22%
1866	508	−1.21%
1872	501	−0.23%
1876	510	+0.45%
1881	506	−0.16%
1886	497	−0.36%
1891	505	+0.32%
1896	513	+0.31%
1901	466	−1.90%

Year	Pop.	±% p.a.
1906	429	−1.64%
1911	383	−2.24%
1921	400	+0.44%
1926	402	+0.10%
1931	415	+0.64%
1936	421	+0.29%
1946	484	+1.40%
1954	592	+2.55%
1962	720	+2.48%
1968	953	+4.78%
1975	1,137	+2.55%
1982	1,186	+0.60%
1990	2,004	+6.78%
1999	2,267	+1.38%
2007	2,232	−0.19%
2012	2,289	+0.51%
2017	2,305	+0.14%
2023	2,391	+0.61%

Source: EHESS and INSEE (1968-2023)

== Sights ==
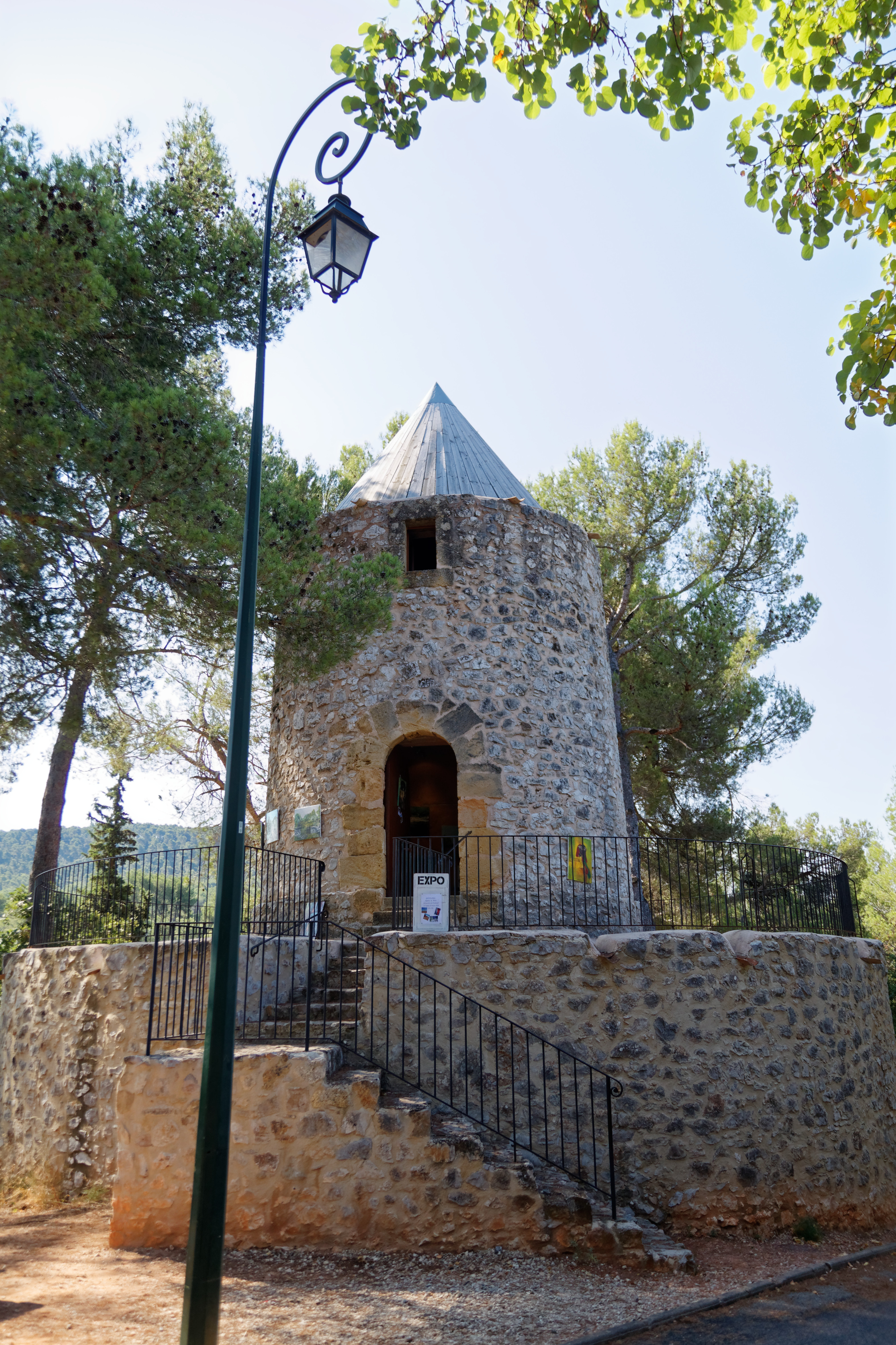
Moulin Cezanne

- The Château du Tholonet (in its current form) was built by Alexandre de Galliffet in the 1640s. Galliffet had bought the plot from the Jarente family, and was president of the Aix-en-Provence parliament. His grandson Louis-François added a theater for his mistress Émilie de Marignane, wife of the famous orator Mirabeau. A marble cutting mill was used for Tholonet marble, known under the name Brêche d'Alep. Currently, the domain is owned by the Société du Canal de Provence (SCP).
- Moulin Cezanne, an old windmill that has been restored. Currently it is used to host painting and sculpture exhibitions.
- Ruins of the Roman aqueduct that brought water from Saint-Antonin to Aix-en-Provence. This fifteen-kilometre aqueduct bridge, located in the Cause ravine, had a rate of nearly 80 liters per second and was one of four aqueducts that supplied Aquae Sextiae, Aix-en-Provence during the Roman period. The Aix painter Jean-Antoine Constantin drew sketches of it, which are now in the Aix-en-Provence Méjanes libraries.
- The Zola Dam in the valley of the Cause river.

== Media ==
- Paul Cézanne, who painted Sainte-Victoire and the black castle at Tholonet, would often eat at the Berne restaurant, today named Relais Cézanne.
- Jacqueline de Romilly, member of the Académie française, wrote the book Sur les chemins de Sainte-Victoire, published by Fallois (2001).
- In 2006, Michel Bernascolle's book Les Rapegons de Sainte-Victoire was published by Cheminements.

== Personalities ==
- Georges Duby, a medieval historian and former member of the Académie française, is buried in Tholonet's small cemetery.

== See also ==
- Communes of the Bouches-du-Rhône department
