= La Fortune des Rougon =

Novel by Émile Zola

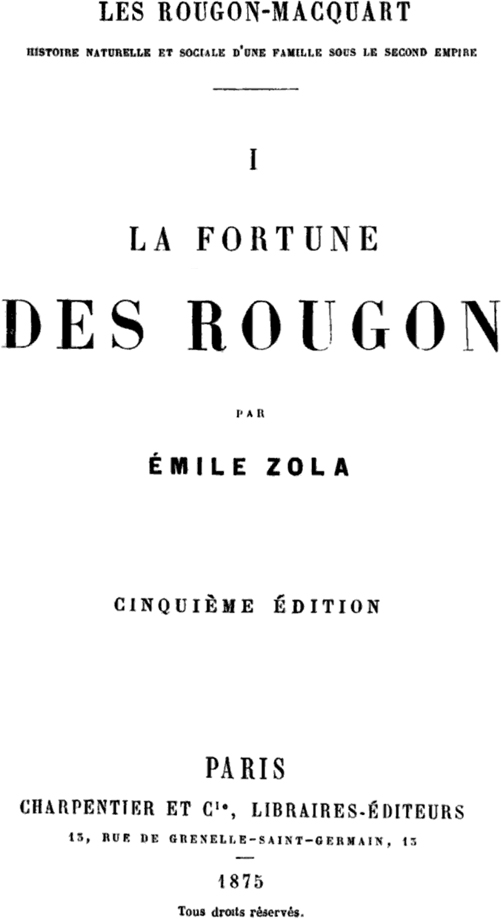
- Fifth edition, 1875
- Author: Émile Zola
- Translator: Brian Nelson
- Language: French
- Series: Les Rougon-Macquart
- Publication date: 1871
- Publication place: France
- English publication date: 2012
- Media type: Print (serial, hardback and paperback)
- Pages: 301 (paperback)
- Followed by: His Excellency Eugène Rougon

La Fortune des Rougon (The Fortune of the Rougons), originally published in 1871, is the first novel in Émile Zola's monumental twenty-volume series Les Rougon-Macquart. The novel is partly an origin story, with a large cast of characters - many of whom become the central figures of later novels in the series - and partly an account of the December 1851 coup d'état that created the French Second Empire under Napoleon III. The events are experienced through the eyes of a large provincial town in southern France. The title refers not only to the "fortune" chased by protagonists Pierre and Felicité Rougon, but also to the fortunes of the various disparate family members Zola introduces, whose lives are of central importance to later books in the series.

== Plot summary ==
After a stirring opening on the eve of the coup d'état, involving an idealistic young village couple joining up with the republican militia in the middle of the night, Zola then spends the next few chapters going back in time to pre-Revolutionary Provence, and proceeds to lay the foundations for the entire Rougon-Macquart cycle, committing himself to what would become the next twenty-two years of his life's work. The fictional town of Plassans (loosely based on the real city of Aix-en-Provence, where Zola grew up and Lorgues, in the Var, where the insurrectional events described in the novel took place in December 1851) is established as the setting for the novel and described in intimate detail, and then we are introduced to the eccentric heroine Adelaide Fouque, later known as "Tante Dide", who becomes the common ancestor for both the Rougon and Macquart families. Her legitimate son from her short marriage to her late husband, a labourer named Rougon who worked on Dide's land, is forced to grow up alongside two illegitimate children — a boy and a girl — from Dide's later romance with the smuggler, poacher and alcoholic Macquart, while the ageing Dide slides further and further into a state of mental illness and borderline senile dementia. From this premise, the next nineteen novels all get their central protagonists and to a certain extent their themes.

The narrative continues along double lines, following both "branches" of the family. We see Pierre Rougon (the legitimate son) in his attempts to disinherit his Macquart half-siblings, his marriage to Felicité Puech, the voraciously ambitious daughter of a local merchant, and their continued failure to establish the fortune, fame and renown they seek, despite their greed and relatively comfortable lifestyles. Approaching old age, the Rougon couple finally admit defeat and settle, crushed, into their lower middle class destinies, until by a remarkable stroke of luck their eldest son Eugène reports from Paris that he has some news that they might find interesting. Eugène has become one of the closest allies of the future Emperor Napoleon III and informs his parents that a coup is imminent. Having been effectively given insider information about which side to back in the coming revolution, the Rougons then make a series of seemingly bold moves to show their loyal and steadfast support for Napoleon III, winning the admiration of the most influential people in the town, mostly royalists who are themselves afraid of showing too much commitment for fear of backing the "wrong horse" and losing their standing and fortune.

The narrative then switches over to the Macquart side of the family, whose grim working-class struggles to survive are juxtaposed keenly with the Rougons' seemingly trivial quest for greater wealth and influence in genteel drawing-room society. Descended from a drunken ne'er-do-well and a madwoman, Zola effectively predestines the Macquarts to lives of toil and misery. Zola's theories of heredity, laid out in the original preface to this novel, were a cornerstone of his entire philosophy and a major reason for his embarking on the mammoth Rougon-Macquart project in the first place in order to illustrate them. Largely discredited nowadays, the theories are largely "present but unseen" in most of the novels in the Rougon-Macquart cycle, allowing those books to be enjoyed without the overshadowing effect of Zola's somewhat suspect scientific ideas. Due to the original story nature of La Fortune des Rougon, the theories are placed much more to the fore, and can appear somewhat heavy-handed as a result.

A third branch of the family, the Mourets, descended from Macquart and Dide's daughter, are then introduced before the novel's focus is brought back to the "present", the night of the coup, via a quite brilliantly told love story. The idealistic but naïve Silvère Mouret falls madly in love with the innocent Miette Chantegreil, and after a long courtship they decide to join up with the republicans to fight the coup. The rest of the novel then picks up from where the opening chapter left off, and from then on is basically a dual narrative telling the story of the old Rougon couple and their increasingly Machiavellian machinations to get themselves into a position of fortune and respect in Plassans, juxtaposed with Silvère and Miette's continuing love story and the doomed republican militia's disastrous attempt to take the town back. Eventually, the Rougons exploit their half-brother Antoine Macquart into inadvertently helping crush the republican threat, and they achieve their life's ambition, fortune and favour. For Silvère and Miette, who committed themselves so completely to a doomed cause, there can be no such happy ending and Zola leaves their half of the story at a bleak dead end.

== Characters ==
This custom of locking the gates every evening was highly characteristic of the spirit of the town, which was a commingling of cowardice, egotism, routine, exclusiveness and devout longing for a cloistered life ... No other town, I believe, has so long persisted in thus incarcerating itself like a nun.

— Chapter 2

Plassans is a stand-in for Zola's hometown, Aix-en-Provence. The author describes both its physical and social aspects in such detail that the town practically becomes one of the book's characters. It is "a sub-prefecture of about ten thousand inhabitants", "built on a plateau overlooking the Viorne, and resting on the north side against the Garrigues hills, one of the last branches of the Alps." Plassans is divided into three distinct neighborhoods: the old quarter where the workers and the destitute live; Sainte-Marc, with the mansions of the wealthy aristocrats; and the new town, home to the bourgeoisie. On Sundays during fine weather, the poor and the wealthy walk, respectively, the north and south sides of the east-west road, promenading without anyone ever giving a thought to crossing to the other side. "They are only separated by a distance of some seven or eight yards, yet it is as if they were a thousand leagues away from each other."

In order of appearance:

=== Chapter 1 ===
- Silvère Mouret: Son of Ursule Macquart, grandson of Adélaïde Fouque; "a strong, sturdy-looking lad" with a "fine mouth and soft, delicate skin ... He must have been about seventeen years of age." As the novel opens in early December 1851, he slips into a desolate area (a former cemetery) of Plassans on a frigid night; he is carrying a carbine, which the reader later discovers was used by his grandfather, the smuggler and poacher Macquart. Silvère has joined the insurgents who intend to overthrow the Empire of Louis-Napoléon and reestablish the Republic. The night the insurgents pass through Plassans, he scuffles for possession of the carbine with a gendarme named Rengade and manages to put out one of Rengade's eyes in the process. Rengade vindictively murders Silvère for this in the book's final chapter.
- Miette Chantegreil: Given name Marie, "thirteen years of age, and although strong and vigorous did not look older owing to the bright childish smile which lit up her countenance ... She was nearly as tall as Silvère, plump and teeming with life." She has been heaped with scorn by the local populace because her poacher father was sent to the galleys as punishment for killing a gendarme, an act he steadfastly maintained in court was one of self-defense; only his sincere incomprehension of the lack of a legal basis for such a defense kept him from the guillotine. Miette and Silvère are desperately in love and intend to marry. After meeting Silvère in the Aire Saint-Mittre, they espy the Republican insurgents marching through the night. She is overcome with the need to prove herself and, not wanting to leave Silvère, she demands to be allowed to carry the insurgents' banner the rest of the night on their march. She is killed during the battle in the streets of Plassans between the Republicans and the National Guard.

=== Chapter 2 ===
- Adélaïde Fouque: Born 1768. "This girl, whose father died insane, was a long, lank pale creature, with a scared look and a strange gait ... As she grew up, she became still stranger..." As the male line had died out, she inherited a sizeable fortune when she was orphaned at eighteen, "which rendered her an eagerly-sought heiress." Instead, she shocked the town by marrying the family's gardener, Rougon.

The Rougon line

- Rougon: A peasant from the Basses-Alpes, "coarse, heavy, vulgar, scarcely able to speak French..." "From a salaried servant, he ascended rapidly to the enviable position of husband." He dies of a sunstroke only fifteen months after his wedding to Adélaïde.
  - Pierre Rougon: Born 1787, son of Adélaïde and Rougon; deeply resents his half-brother and half-sister, Antoine and Ursule Macquart; thinking himself the rightful heir to his mother's estate because he is the only one of her children born in wedlock, he schemes to cut them as well as their mother out of anything he can; becomes fat and flabby. By skillful maneuvering during the Republican insurgency of December 1851, this heretofore lowly vegetable oil dealer gains power and respect in Plassans.
  - Felicité Puech: Wife of Pierre Rougon; "A short, dark woman such as one often meets in Provence. She looked like one of those brown, lean, noisy grasshoppers ... thin, flat-breasted with pointed shoulders and a face like that of a polecat, with singularly sunken and attenuated features ... The slyness of a cat was visible under her narrow, black eyes..." After uncovering her husband's secret maneuverings during the insurgency, she deftly manipulates the situation to assure he achieves the influence in Plassans that she has for so long coveted.
  - Pierre and Felicité's three sons: Convinced that at least one of their sons will shower his parents with the blessings of success, Felicité convinces Pierre to send them to the local college and then, at great expense, to extend their education in Paris. When they return to Plassans they are unable to apply what they've learned: "The three young men idled about and grew fat."
    - Eugène Rougon: Born 1811; "A man of middle height, slightly bald, and already disposed to obesity. He had has father's face, a long face with broad features ... This big fellow usually exhibited a formidable, sleepy attitude ... he longed for self-indulgence..." Having studied law in Paris, he tried to make a go in Plassans but "seldom succeeded in gaining a case for a client." Anticipating the excitement of the disturbances of February 1848, "he formed a sudden resolution and left for Paris, with scarcely five hundred francs in his pocket." From there, he keeps his father back in Provence informed of political developments, allowing Pierre to position himself for the right moment to take power in Plassans.
    - Pascal Rougon: Born 1813; lives modestly as a doctor immersed in research; has no regard for his relatives' scheming for material gain; subject of the final novel in the series, Doctor Pascal.
    - Aristide Rougon: Born 1815; "... so to speak, diametrically opposed to Eugène. He had his mother's face, with a covetousness and slyness of character adapted to trivial intrigues ... Short with a pitiful countenance like the knob of a stick ... Aristide ferreted and fumbled everywhere, without any scruples, eager only to gratify himself..." Irritated by his father's opportunistic royalist tendencies and the people who have formed a reactionary circle around his parents, he begins writing scurrilous articles in Plassans' left-wing newspaper, the Indépendant. He fakes a hand injury as an excuse for not submitting an article taking sides when the Republicans enter Plassans, for which his mother mocks him. He gets back into Felicité's good graces in time to be part of his parents' triumphant takeover of Plassans.
  - Pierre and Felicité's two daughters: "The last comers had but an indifferent welcome; daughters are a terrible embarrassment when one has no dowry to give them ... The race of the Rougons was destined to become refined through its female side." Sidonie is born in 1818 and Marthe the following year; Rougon marries Marthe off to her cousin François Mouret, son of her aunt Ursule Macquart.

The Macquart line

- Macquart: A smuggler and poacher, dreaded by the women of Plassans, who refer to him almost exclusively as "that scoundrel Macquart." "Tall, with a formidable beard and lean face ... Though he was hardly thirty years old, he looked fifty ... the furtive sorrowful glance of a man of vagrant instincts, rendered vicious by wine and a pariah life." Adélaïde inexplicably takes up with him after the death of her husband, scandalizing the people of Plassans. He is killed by a shot from a custom-house officer while trying to smuggle a load of Geneva watches across the border. Adélaïde moves from the substantial Fouque family home into the hovel left her by Macquart. She proudly hangs Macquart's carbine, boldly retrieved from the site of his death by a fellow smuggler, above the mantel. This is the weapon Silvère takes when he fatefully joins the Republican insurgents.
  - Antoine Macquart: Born 1789, the older bastard child of Adélaïde and Macquart. "Antoine resembled his mother in his total want of dignified will, in his effeminate voluptuous egotism, which disposed him to accept any bed of infamy provided he could lounge upon it at his ease..." Gets drafted because Pierre, being the first-born son, is exempt. Returns to Plassans after his time in the army to discover that Pierre has inveigled their mother out of her fortune. He is enraged but Pierre and Felicité buy him off with a pittance. Antoine takes to basket-making but spends the money as soon as he earns it. He marries 'Phine Gavaudan and they produce three children (see Josephine Gavaudan below). He treats the children practically as slaves and takes the money they earn to support his idle lifestyle. He manages to convince the other working-class people of Plassans that he is the embodiment of why the bourgeoisie needs to be overthrown so they can spread the wealth: "...devoured by envy and hatred...[Antoine] welcomed the Republic as a happy era when he would be allowed to fill his pockets from his neighbour’s cash-box." Arrested by Pierre and the reactionary circle during the insurgency, Felicité maneuvers him into agreeing to lead a breakout of the Republicans; he agrees after much wheedling and haggling over a payoff but is suspicious of her and Pierre's motives, sensing an ambush.
  - Ursule Macquart: Born 1791, the younger bastard child of Adélaïde and Macquart; "poor, puny, wan little creature." Marries Mouret, they produce three children. Her brother approaches Mouret for financial help after exhausting Pierre's patience and is informed that Mouret and his wife wish to have nothing to do with the dramas of her birth family. Ursule dies of consumption in 1839 and Mouret, distraught, ruins his business and commits suicide a year later.
    - François Mouret (b. 1817): A "quiet, punctilious youth" who "seemed born to pass his life behind a grocer’s counter." After being orphaned, Pierre Rougon takes him into his household, needing an "industrious and sober" young man to work for him and replace Aristide. Pierre marries him off to his daughter Marthe "whom he did not know how to dispose of." The couple figures prominently in The Conquest of Plassans.
    - Hélène Mouret (b. 1824): After being orphaned, she marries a clerk; appears in The Sin of Father Mouret.
    - Silvère Mouret: Born 1834; a sickly child, Pierre is more than happy to foist the orphan off on the boy's grandmother Adélaïde, whom Silvère calls Tante (Aunt) Dide. She dotes on the child; he says "I was born to pardon her." A voracious reader, he is naturally drawn to the Republican ideals of liberty, equality and fraternity, and from Rousseau, he "indulged in another dream, that of compelling men to be happy even by force." "Blinded by enthusiasm, he...would not allow for men’s weaknesses; he required an ideal government of perfect justice and perfect liberty." During the night of the insurgents' entry into Plassans, he scuffles with a gendarme named Rengade and puts his eye out. This will result in Silvère's execution at the book's end.

=== Chapter 3 ===
The Yellow Drawing-Room Group

- Marquis de Carnavant: "... a little, lean, active man, seventy-five years old at that time ..." His scandalous connection to Felicité's mother and his physical resemblance to her suggest to some that he may be her father. Even when Felicité is in her fifties, he pats her on the cheek and addresses her as "little one." He is the leader of the reactionary group that assembles every night in the Rougons' shabby drawing room, decorated in a yellowish tinge.
- Isidore Granoux: An old almond dealer, has a "hare-lip mouth, cloven a little way from the nose." Speaks little but whenever the Republicans are mentioned, he mutters imprecations such as idlers, scoundrels, thieves and assassins. The night of the Republican breakout, he repeatedly strikes the tocsin with a hammer, greatly to Pierre Rougon's annoyance but forever after considering himself a hero for alerting Plassans' inhabitants.
- Monseiur Roudier: A rich landlord "with a plump insinuating face;" one of Pierre Rougon's closest associates during the uncertain days of the Republican insurgency.
- Commander Sicardot: Father-in-law to Aristide Rougon and certainly "the strongest intellect of the yellow drawing-room ... Of Herculean frame with a brick-red face ... he was reckoned one of the pompous old dolts of the Grande Armée." Fiercely devoted to Bonapartist principles, he is one of the few who, from a sense of duty rather than the possibility of gain, display real physical courage in the events to come.
- Monseiur Vuillet: Bookseller, a strict Catholic, dealer in rosaries and other religious paraphernalia. "By a stroke of genius he had combined with his business the publication of a little bi-weekly journal, the Gazette des Plassans, which was devoted exclusively to the interests of the clergy." He engages in running battles in its pages with the Republican writings of Aristide Rougon in the Indépendant. On the night Pierre's reactionary band takes the town back from the insurgents, Vuillet sees his chance and takes over the post office, allowing him to read the townspeoples' mail. Felicité bribes him into holding certain mail for one day, but shows great annoyance when he joins Pierre at the celebration of victory over the Republicans.

=== Chapter 4 ===
- Josephine Gavaudan: Known as 'Phine, "a tall, strapping wench of about thirty... she might have put some money aside had she not had a partiality for liqueurs..." Although she is physically formidable, she has a quiet voice and is very reserved. Antoine Macquart is in the last extremity and on the verge of rejoining the army when he meets and marries her. The couple beat each other mercilessly when drunk and have no memory of it when they sober up. She dies of a lung infection in early 1850. They produce three children:
  - Lisa Macquart: Born 1824; The wife of the postmaster takes an interest in Lisa; upon being widowed, she takes Lisa to Paris with her when the child is 15; Antoine is glad to be rid of another mouth to feed. The activities in and near the charcuterie run by Lisa and her husband near the market of Les Halles in Paris are the subject of The Belly of Paris.
  - Gervaise Macquart: Born 1829; A cripple from birth; 'Phine drinks aniseed with her when Antoine is not around. She gives birth for the first time at 14. Upon her mother's death, unable to bear life with her greedy, lazy father any longer, she and her husband Lantier depart for Paris with their two children. Her life as a laundress and descent into alcoholism, resulting in her eventual starvation under a staircase in Paris, are the subject of The Place Where You Can Get Knocked Out. Each of her four children is featured in a novel in the series: Claude Lantier (The Masterpiece), Jacques Lantier (The Beast in Man), Étienne Lantier (Germinal), and Anna Coupeau (Nana).
  - Jean Macquart: Born 1831; Even tempered, tries to bring peace to the home when his parents become inflamed. He too leaves Antoine's house upon his mother's death. Trained as a carpenter, he becomes an itinerant farmer and figures prominently in The Earth and The Downfall.
- Justin Rebufat: "A youth of twenty years old, a sickly, squint-eyed creature, who harboured implacable hatred against his cousin Miette." Justin's mother, Eulalie Chantegreil, is the wife of the farmer Rebufat and sister of Miette's convict father. When Miette's father is sent to the galleys, her aunt Eulalie takes her in, selling Rebufat on the idea that she will compensate for being a presence in the household by being a hard little worker. Justin indulges his vicious hatred for Miette by taunting his cousin mercilessly over the fate of her father. The night the insurgents enter Plassans he seeks her out and mocks her again while a crowd watches. At the book's end, he runs to be in time to watch the revenge killing of her fiancé Silvère, which he gleefully witnesses.

== English Translations ==
The second English translation by Henry Vizetelly was published in 1886 and extensively revised (to meet Victorian standards of propriety and avoid prosecution for issuing an indecent publication) by Ernest Vizetelly in 1898, issued under the title The Fortune of the Rougons by Chatto & Windus. It is of reasonably poor quality, not helped by Vizetelly's boast that he had changed one in every three sentences in the course of his editing.

=== Expurgated ===
1. The Girl in Scarlet; or, The Loves of Silvère and Miette (1882, tr. John Stirling, T. B. Peterson & Brothers)
2. The Fortune of the Rougons (1886, tr. unknown for H. Vizetelly, Vizetelly & Co.)
3. The Fortune of the Rougons (1898, tr. unknown edited by E. A. Vizetelly, Chatto & Windus)

=== Unexpurgated ===
No other translation was available until 2012, when Brian Nelson published one under the Oxford World's Classics imprint and it is the only uncensored and complete translation of the novel to date.

- The Fortune of the Rougons (2012, tr. Brian Nelson, Oxford University Press)

== Adaptations ==
The novel was adapted into a 1980 French TV miniseries, La fortune des Rougon, directed by Yves-André Hubert and starring Madeleine Robinson as Adelaide and Christian Barbier as the adult Pierre.
