= Zola Dam =

Dam in Le Tholonet, France

Coordinates: 43.5323°N 5.5114°E

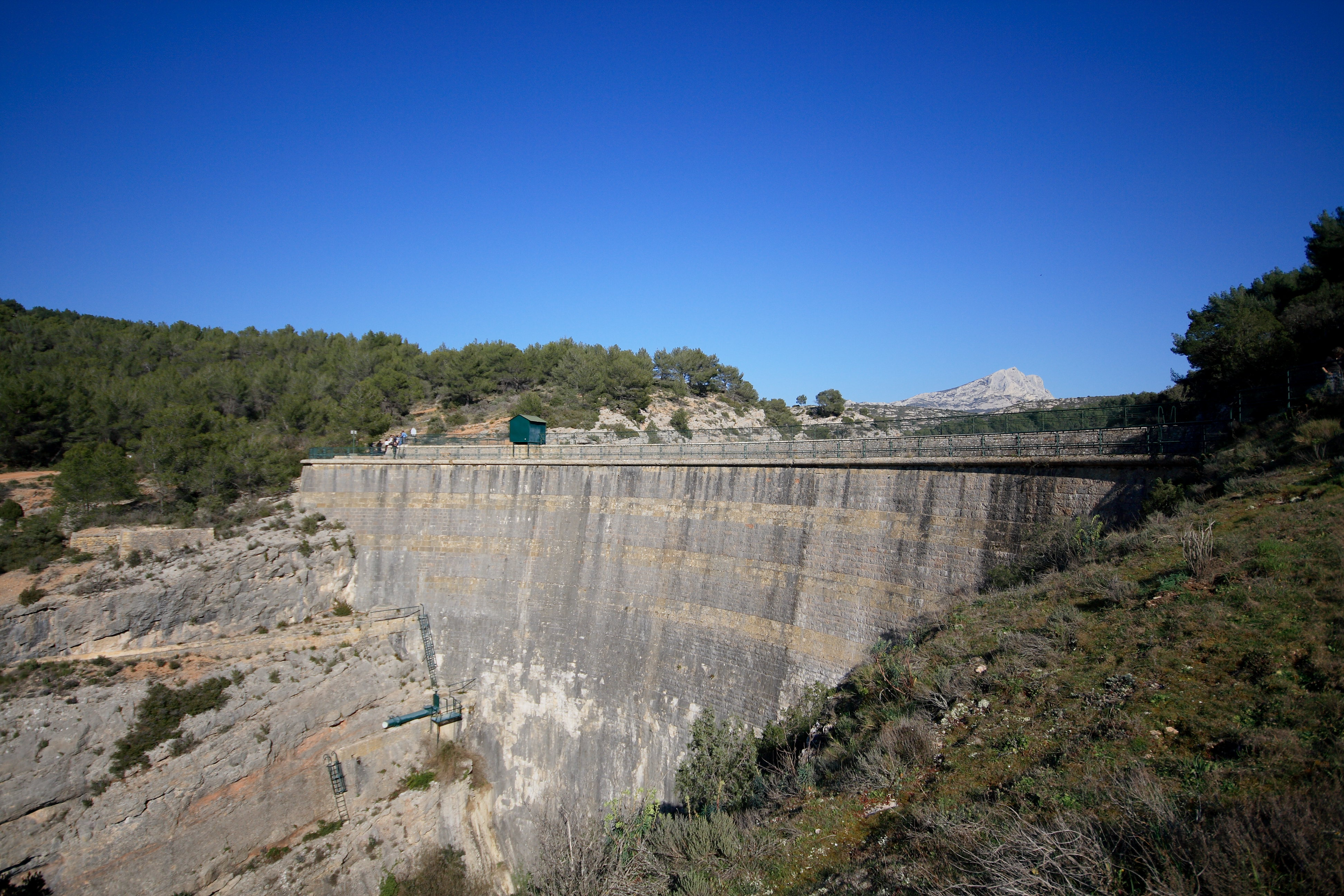
The Zola Dam.

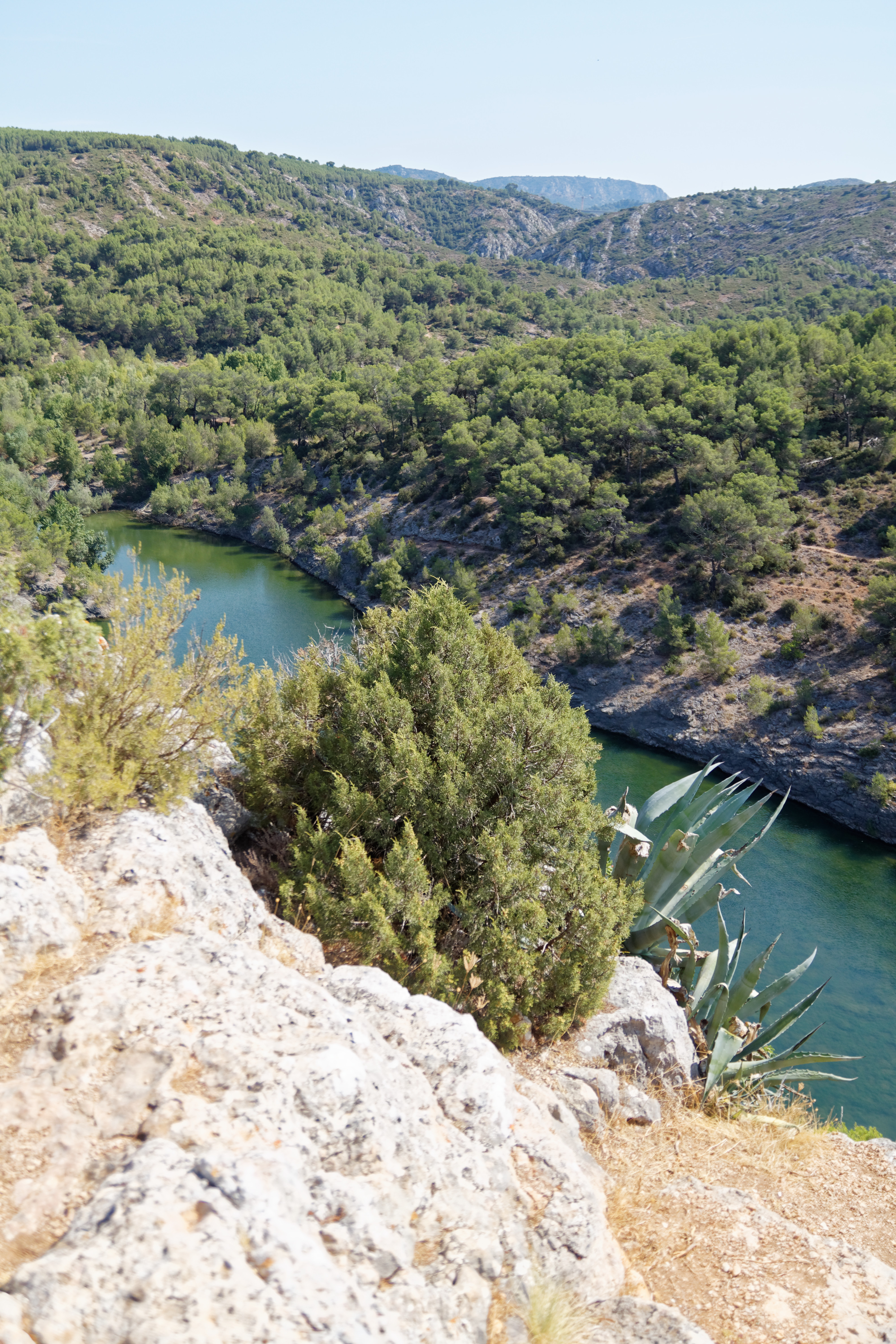
Zola Lake.

Zola Dam is a dam in Le Tholonet near Aix-en-Provence, France.

== History ==
The dam was designed by Italian-born engineer François Zola, the father of novelist Émile Zola. Its construction was initially rejected by Gaston Alexandre Auguste, Marquis de Galliffet, the landowner, in 1838.

Zola founded the Société du Canal Zola in 1846 and began construction. He died, however, in 1847, and the company was acquired by author and politician Jules Migeon in 1853. Construction of the dam was completed on September 10, 1854, and it was dedicated on December 16, 1854.

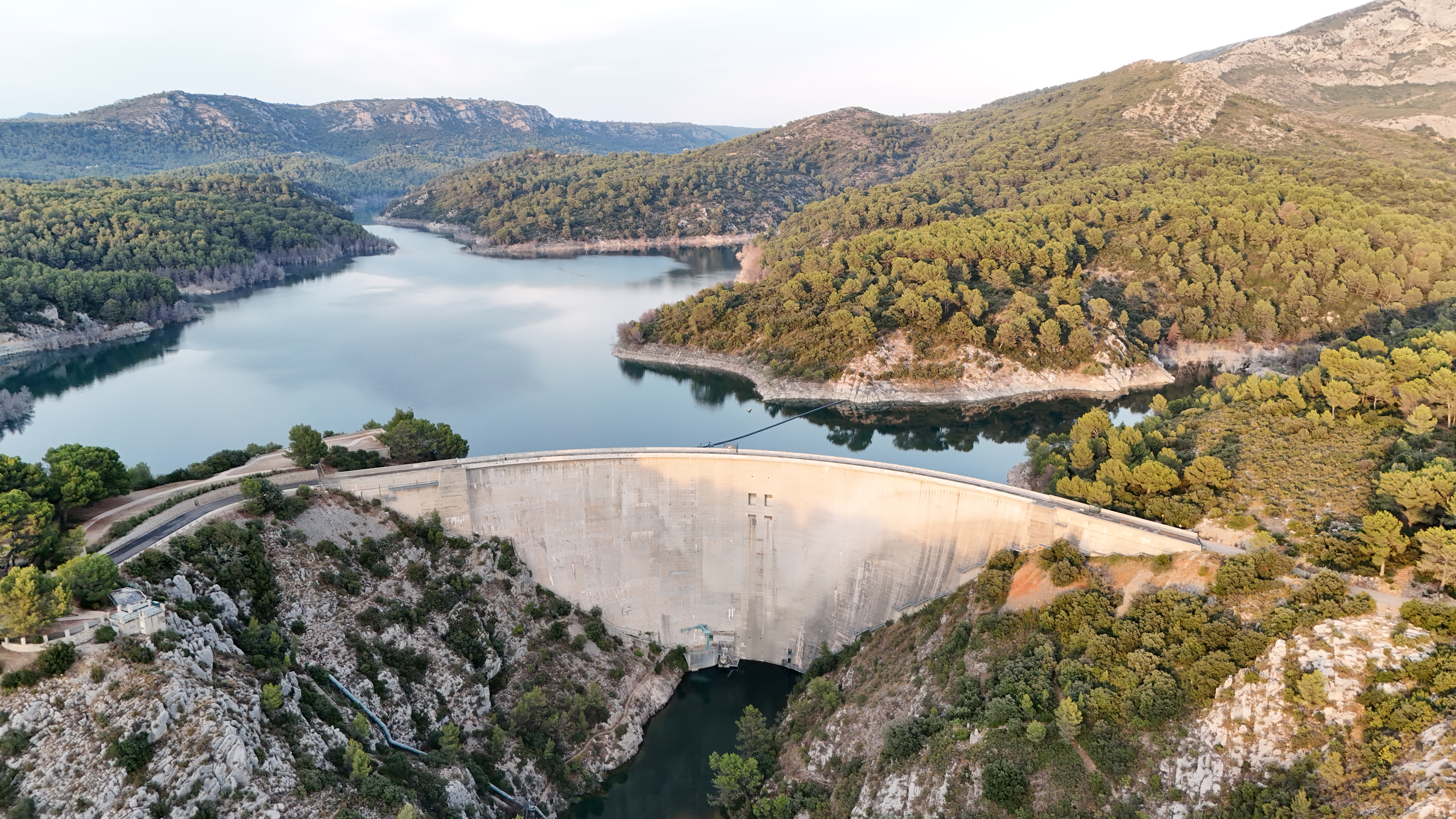
Barrage de Bimont – dam near Aix-en-Provence (aerial view)

The dam was painted by Paul Cézanne in the 1880s. The painting belonged to Paul Gauguin in 1885. It was purchased by Gwendoline Davies in 1918, who donated it to the National Museum Wales in 1952.
