= La Conquête de Plassans =

1874 novel by Émile Zola

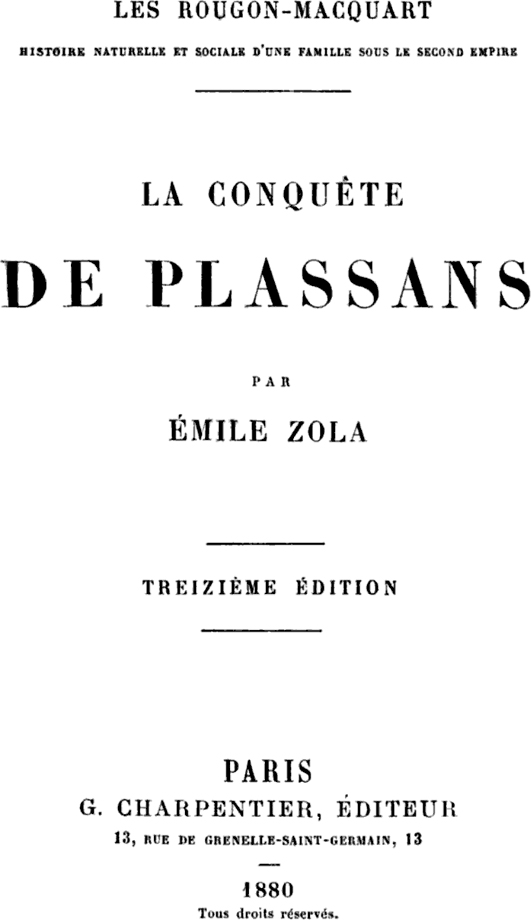
- La Conquête de Plassans
- Author: Émile Zola
- Translator: Helen Constantine
- Language: French
- Series: Les Rougon-Macquart
- Genre: Novel
- Publication date: 1874
- Publication place: France
- English publication date: 2014
- Media type: Print (Serial, Hardback & Paperback)
- Pages: 352 (paperback)
- Preceded by: The Dream
- Followed by: Pot Luck

La Conquête de Plassans (1874), published in English as The Conquest of Plassans and A Priest in the House, is the fourth novel in French writer Émile Zola's twenty-volume series Les Rougon-Macquart. In many ways a sequel to the first novel in the cycle, La Fortune des Rougon (1871), this novel is again centred on the fictional Provençal town of Plassans and its plot revolves around a sinister cleric's attempt at political intrigue with disastrous consequences for some of the townsfolk.

== Plot ==
At the start of the novel, the home life of Francois Mouret and his wife and cousin Marthe (née Rougon) is portrayed as a generally pleasant and relaxed existence. Francois is slightly compulsive in his behaviour and Marthe clearly suffers from some sort of mental illness, which Zola intended to portray as a genetic consequence of the Rougon-Macquart family's tangled ancestry. Their three children include the eldest son Octave, an intelligent but feckless ladies' man (featured as the principal character of two later novels in the cycle, Pot-Bouille (1882) and Au Bonheur des Dames (1883), but here little more than a footnote), as well as the quiet and introverted younger son Serge and the mentally disabled daughter Desirée. Their home lives are shattered by the arrival of a strange cleric, Abbé Faujas, and his mother, who rent a room in the Mourets' house. Slowly, it transpires that the mysterious stranger has arrived to try to win influence in the town for outside political forces (which never manifest themselves) through a series of Machiavellian intrigues, plots, slanders and insinuations; in the process of doing so, he proceeds to unravel the Mourets' lives to such an extent that the bewildered Francois is unwillingly and unnecessarily committed to a mental institution, while poor Marthe becomes obsessively religious, though whether her devotion is to God or Faujas becomes increasingly unclear. In Mouret's absence, and Marthe's indifference, Faujas' unscrupulous sister Olympe and brother in law Trouche take over the Mouret's house, and live high at their expense. The reaction of the townsfolk to Faujas' outside influence is fascinatingly drawn by Zola, and the tactics of the groups who are in "resistance" to Abbé Faujas' clever machinations are very keenly observed. The narrative is kept up at a tremendous pace and builds to a quite astonishing climax of violence and horror as Zola ends the novel in a near-apocalyptic fury.

== Analysis ==
Although the novel does assume in its readers a degree of familiarity with the battle between clerical political interests and governmental influence in the provincial towns of the Second Empire - knowledge which Zola's contemporary readers would certainly have taken for granted, but which seems obscure and almost arcane now - its strength lies not in its politics but in its human drama. On the face of it this could have been a relatively dull series of political observations, but instead by the end it is almost a melodrama, such is the anticlerical fury which Zola instils in his work.

== English translations ==
The English translation done by Ernest Vizetelly in the 1880s, still in print under the title The Conquest of Plassans, is much more readable than many of the other Vizetelly texts. A more modern retranslation was undertaken by Brian Rhys for Elek Books and published in 1957 under the more expressive but less faithful title A Priest in the House but it is no longer widely available.

=== Expurgated ===
1. The Conquest of Plassans (c. 1879, tr. John Sterling, T. B. Peterson & Brother)
2. The Conquest of Plassans (1887, tr. unknown/Ernest Vizetelly for Henry Vizetelly Vizetelly & Co.)

=== Unexpurgated ===
1. A Priest in the House (1957, tr. Brian Rhys, Elek Books)
2. The Conquest of Plassans (2014, tr. Helen Constantine, Oxford University Press)
