= R. H. Gapper Book Prize =

The R. Gapper Book Prize, originally titled R.H. Gapper Book Prize, offered by the Society for French Studies, is a monetary prize that was inaugurated in 2002 and has since been awarded annually for the best book published in the field of French Studies by a scholar based at an institution of higher education in the UK or Ireland. Since 2014 the prize has been named the R. Gapper prize, in honour of both Richard Paul Charles Gapper and his father.

== Table of winners ==
Year	Author	Book
2019 (joint)	Peter Dayan	The Music of Dada: A Lesson in Intermediality for our Times (London: Routledge, 2018)
2019 (joint)	Derek Offord; Vladislav Rjeoutski; Gésine Argent	The French Language in Russia: A Social, Political, Cultural and Literary History (Amsterdam: Amsterdam University Press, 2018, ISBN 9789462982727)
2018	Julian Swann	Exile, Imprisonment or Death: The Politics of Disgrace in Bourbon France, 1610-1789 (Oxford University Press, 2017, ISBN 9780198788690)
2017	Roger Pearson	Unacknowledged Legislators: The Poet as Lawgiver in Post-Revolutionary France (Oxford University Press, 2016)
2016 (joint)	Neil Kenny	Death and Tenses: Posthumous Presence in Early Modern France (Oxford University Press, 2015)
2016 (joint)	Patrick McGuinness	Poetry and Radical Politics in fin de siècle France: From Anarchism to Action Française (Oxford University Press, 2015)
2015	Robert Mills	Seeing sodomy in the Middle Ages (University of Chicago Press, 2014)
2014	Christopher Prendergast	Mirages and Mad Beliefs: Proust the skeptic (Princeton University Press, 2013)
2013	Siân Reynolds	Marriage and Revolution: Monsieur et Madame Roland (Oxford University Press, 2012)
2012	Michael Moriarty	Disguised Vices. Theories of Virtue in Early Modern French Thought (Oxford University Press, 2011)
2011	Judith Still	Derrida and Hospitality: Theory and Practice (Edinburgh University Press, 2010)
2010	Ardis Butterfield	The Familiar Enemy: Chaucer, Language and Nation in the Hundred Years War (Oxford: Oxford University Press, 2009)
2009	Alain Viala	La France galante (Paris: Presses Universitaires de France, 2008)
2008 (joint)	Christopher Prendergast	The Classic. Sainte-Beuve and the Nineteenth-Century Culture Wars (Oxford University Press, 2007)
2008 (joint)	Mark Greengrass	Governing Passions. Peace and Reform in the French Kingdom, 1576-1585 (Oxford University Press, 2007)
2007	Eric Robertson	Arp: Painter, Poet, Sculptor (Yale University Press, 2006)
2006	Maria C. Scott	Baudelaire’s ‘Le Spleen de Paris’: Shifting Perspectives (Ashgate Publishing, 2005)
2005	Roger Pearson	Mallarmé and Circumstance: The Translation of Silence (Oxford University Press, 2004)
2004	Sylvia Huot	Madness in Medieval French Literature: Identities lost and found (Oxford University Press, 2003)
2003	Clive Scott	Channel Crossings: French and English Poetry in Dialogue 1550-2000 (Legenda, 2002)
2002	Stephen Bann	Parallel Lines: Printmakers, Painters and Photographers in Nineteenth-Century France (Yale University Press, 2001)
