= Francofil =

Electronic forum for discussion of French and Francophone studies

Francofil is the most widely used electronic discussion forum in the field of French and Francophone studies.

== History ==
Francofil was launched on 2 November 1995 at the University of Liverpool, by Kay Chadwick of the University of Liverpool and Tim Unwin of the University of Bristol. They were later joined as list administrator by Jane Gilbert. Its predecessor was Ozfrench, the electronic discussion forum for academics working in French studies in Australia, which Tim Unwin had launched in 1993. Francofil shares a large part of its membership with the Society for French Studies, though the relationship is informal.

== Diffusion and topics ==
In November 2020, twenty-five years after its launch, Francofil had 3300 subscribers. These subscribers are principally but not exclusively from institutions of higher education, in 44 different countries. This makes it the most widely used forum in French studies in the English-speaking world. Posts are moderated by the list administrators, Kay Chadwick, Tim Unwin and Jane Gilbert. Contributions to the list, which are mainly in English with a substantial minority in French, are automatically archived at: "Archives of Francofil". Francofil is a forum for intellectual debate within the international academic community of French Studies, as well as serving as a medium of exchange for practical matters such as the sharing of resources and job announcements. It has also replaced print media in allowing the immediate exchange of information for which scholars once relied on the ‘Queries, Requests, Information’ section of the paper journal the French Studies Bulletin, as its editor himself points out. Francofil is described as an ‘invaluable’ resource for scholarly consultation by Anthony Rudolf in The White Review.
