= L'Œuvre =

1886 novel by Émile Zola

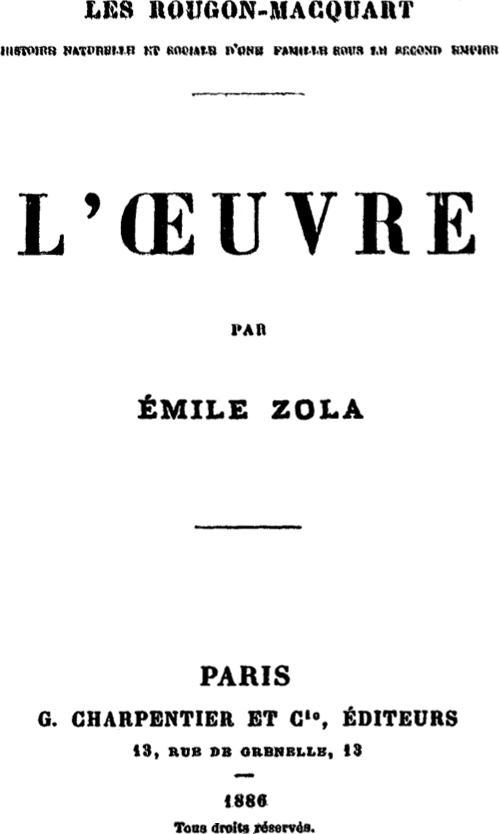
- The Masterpiece (1886) by Émile Zola (1840–1902)
- Author: Émile Zola
- Translator: Thomas Walton and Roger Pearson
- Language: French
- Series: Les Rougon-Macquart
- Genre: Novel
- Publisher: Charpentier (book form)
- Publication date: 1885–1886 (serial) and 1886 (book form)
- Publication place: France
- English publication date: 1993
- Media type: Print (serial, hardback & paperback)
- Pages: 400 (paperback)
- Preceded by: The Drinking Den
- Followed by: The Beast Within

L'Œuvre (The Masterpiece) is the fourteenth novel in the Rougon-Macquart series by Émile Zola. It was first serialized in the periodical Gil Blas beginning in December 1885 before being published in novel form by Charpentier in 1886. The title, translated literally as "The Work" (as in work of art), is often rendered in English as The Masterpiece or His Masterpiece. It refers to the struggles of the protagonist Claude Lantier to paint a great work reflecting his talent and genius.

== Inspiration and subject matter ==
L'Œuvre was in part inspired by Zola's friendship with Paul Cézanne, and offers a vivid and panoramic portrayal of the Parisian art world in the 1860s and 1870s. Zola and Cézanne grew up together in Aix-en-Provence, the model for Zola's Plassans, where Claude Lantier was born and received his education. Like Cézanne, Claude Lantier is a revolutionary artist whose work is misunderstood by an art-going public hidebound by traditional subjects, techniques and representations. Many of the characteristics ascribed to Claude Lantier are a composite taken from the lives of several impressionist painters including Claude Monet, Édouard Manet, as well as Paul Cézanne. Zola's self-portrait can be seen in the character of the novelist Pierre Sandoz.

The book has often been blamed for ending the friendship between Cézanne and Zola, but some critics are unconvinced. It was formerly thought that no correspondence exists between the two after a letter in which Cézanne thanks Zola for sending him the novel, but in 2013 a friendly letter from Cézanne in 1887 was discovered.

The novel spans the years 1862 to 1876. Besides depicting the bohemian art world of 19th-century Paris, L'Œuvre explores the rise of Realism, Naturalism and Impressionism in painting. Zola also looks at contemporary sculpture, literature, architecture, music and journalism, as well as the commodification of art. In creating his portrayal of the Parisian art world Zola includes several characters who are composites of real-life art world related figures; artists, writers, art dealers, and friends that he knew. In his book-length study of the novel, Robert Niess says it is "a most valuable book for knowledge of the art world between 1863 and 1885, and its documentary basis gives it real significance as an inside history of the times. It is by all odds the most complete novelistic treatment of the art world of the Impressionists."

L'Œuvre was translated into English by Ernest A. Vizetelly in 1886 (reprinted by Barnes & Noble in 2006); other translations have appeared since. One of the most readily accessible is that by Thomas Walton (1950), revised in 1993 by Roger Pearson for Oxford World's Classics.

== Plot summary ==
Painter Claude Lantier advocates painting real subjects in real places, most notably outdoors. This is in stark contrast to the artistic establishment, where artists painted in the studio and concentrated on mythological, historical and religious subjects. His art making is revolutionary and he has a small circle of like-minded friends equally intent on shaking up the art world and challenging the establishment. His best friends are his childhood comrades Pierre Sandoz, novelist and Louis Dubuche, an architect. Like Zola, Sandoz contemplates a series of novels about a family based in science and incorporating modern people and everyday lives. Dubuche is not half as bold as Claude and he chooses a more conventional course, opting for the security of a middle-class life and a bourgeois marriage. Sandoz extols marriage for the stability it brings to his creative life.

The outcry in the artistic community over the sidelining of new artists in favor of popular, established, traditional artists at the annual Salon of the Académie des Beaux-Arts leads to the creation of a Salon des Refusés for the rejected artists to display their work. No painting gathers more interest or generates more criticism than Claude's. Entitled Plein Air (Open Air), it depicts a nude female figure in the front center and two female nudes in the background, with a fully dressed man, back to the viewer in the foreground. (Zola deliberately invokes Le déjeuner sur l'herbe by Édouard Manet, which provoked outcries at the actual Salon des Refusés in 1863.)

Claude moves to the country to soak up more of the "open air" atmosphere he revelled in as a child and to create more masterpieces. Accompanying him is Christine Hallegrain, who served as the model for Claude's nude and they have a son. Claude is unable to paint much and grows more and more depressed. For the sake of his health, Christine convinces him to return to Paris. Claude has three paintings in three years rejected by the Salon before a spectacular view of the Île de la Cité captures his imagination. He becomes obsessed with this vision and constructs a massive canvas on which to paint his masterpiece. He is unable to project his ideas successfully or combine them into a meaningful whole. He begins adding incongruous elements (like a female nude bather), reworks and repaints until the whole enterprise collapses into disaster, then starts over. His inability to create his masterpiece deepens his depression. The slow breakup of his circle of friends contributes to his decaying mental state, as does the success of one of his confreres, a lesser talent who has co-opted the Open Air school and made it a critical and financial triumph.

Christine, whom he has at last married, watches as the painting – and especially the nude – begins to destroy his soul. When their son dies, Claude is inspired to paint a picture of the dead body that is accepted by the Salon (after considerable politicking). The painting is mostly ignored, but ridiculed by those who do see it, including Claude's old comrades. Claude again turns to his huge landscape. Christine watches as he spirals further into obsession and madness. A last-ditch effort to free him from Art in general and from his wished-for masterpiece in particular has an effect, but in the end Claude hangs himself from his scaffolding. The only ones of his old friends who attend his funeral are Sandoz and Bongrand, an elder statesman of the artistic community who recognized and helped nurture Claude's genius.

== Relation to the other Rougon-Macquart novels ==
Claude Lantier (b. 1842, the son of Gervaise Macquart and Auguste Lantier) is first introduced briefly as a child in La fortune des Rougon. In L'assommoir, he comes to Paris with his parents but returns to Plassans under the sponsorship of a local patron who recognizes his artistic talent. In Le ventre de Paris, Claude has returned to Paris and is discovered in the Les Halles marketplace searching for realistic subjects to paint.

Zola's plan for the Rougon-Macquart novels was to show how heredity and environment worked on a family over the course of the Second French Empire. Claude is the son (and grandson) of alcoholics and inherits their predisposition for self-destruction. All of the descendants of Adelaïde Fouque (Tante Dide), Claude's great-grandmother demonstrate what today would be called obsessive-compulsive behaviors. In Claude, this is manifested in his obsessive approach to making art.

Claude's brothers are Jacques Lantier (La bête humaine), the engine driver who becomes a murderer and Étienne Lantier (Germinal), the miner who becomes a revolutionary and union agitator. Their half-sister is the prostitute Anna (Nana) Coupeau (Nana).

Claude's son Jacques also figures in L'Œuvre, a sickly, lonely child neglected by both parents, who dies from unspecified causes.

== Historical basis ==
The book includes a few autobiographical details. As a young journalist, Zola wrote many articles on art and he was deeply interested in the newest ways of painting; he was one of the earliest champions of the work of Édouard Manet. The character of Sandoz, a young writer whose ambition is to write a story of a family that would portray the present epoch, is most clearly a self-portrait of the author. The basis of some of the other characters, including Claude Lantier, is murkier. Though Claude is most often understood as being based on Cézanne, the Impressionist painters Édouard Manet and Claude Monet are often cited as other possible sources. (In fact, Claude Lantier's first painting in the book is based on Manet's Le déjeuner sur l'herbe.) In a letter written after the novel's appearance in 1886, Claude Monet (who was acquainted with Cézanne and Manet) indicated that he did not recognize himself or any of his fellow painters in the character. Other parallels between the author's life and the novel include Lantier's dead child painting being similar to Monet's portrait of the deceased Camille (his first wife), Lantier's idea of mobile studios mirroring Monet's and loose ties equating Fagerolles and Manet. In the book, the Open Air school takes its name from the title of Lantier's first mentioned painting. In real life, the Impressionists got their name from Monet's 1874 painting Impression: Sunrise. The terms Open Air (Plein air) and Impressionism were given an insulting edge by hostile critics and jeering crowds.

== English Translations ==
=== Expurgated ===
1. The Masterpiece (1886, tr. G. D. Cox, T. B. Peterson & Bros.)
2. His Masterpiece (1886, tr. Albert Vandam, Vizetelly & Co.)
3. His Masterpiece (1902, tr. Albert Vandam edited by E. A. Vizetelly, Chatto & Windus)

=== Unexpurgated ===
1. The Masterpiece (1946, tr. Katherine Woods, Howell Soskin)
2. The Masterpiece (1950, tr. Thomas Walton, Elek Books)
3. The Masterpiece (1993, tr. Roger Pearson's revision of Thomas Walton's translation Oxford University Press)

== Sources ==
- Brown, Frederick (1995). Zola: A Life. New York: Farrar, Straus & Giroux.
- Niess, Robert J. (1968). Zola, Cézanne, and Manet: A Study of L'Œuvre, Ann Arbor: The University of Michigan Press.
- Zola, Emile. L'Œuvre, translated as The Masterpiece by Thomas Walton (1950), revised by Roger Pearson (1993).
