= Stephen Bann =

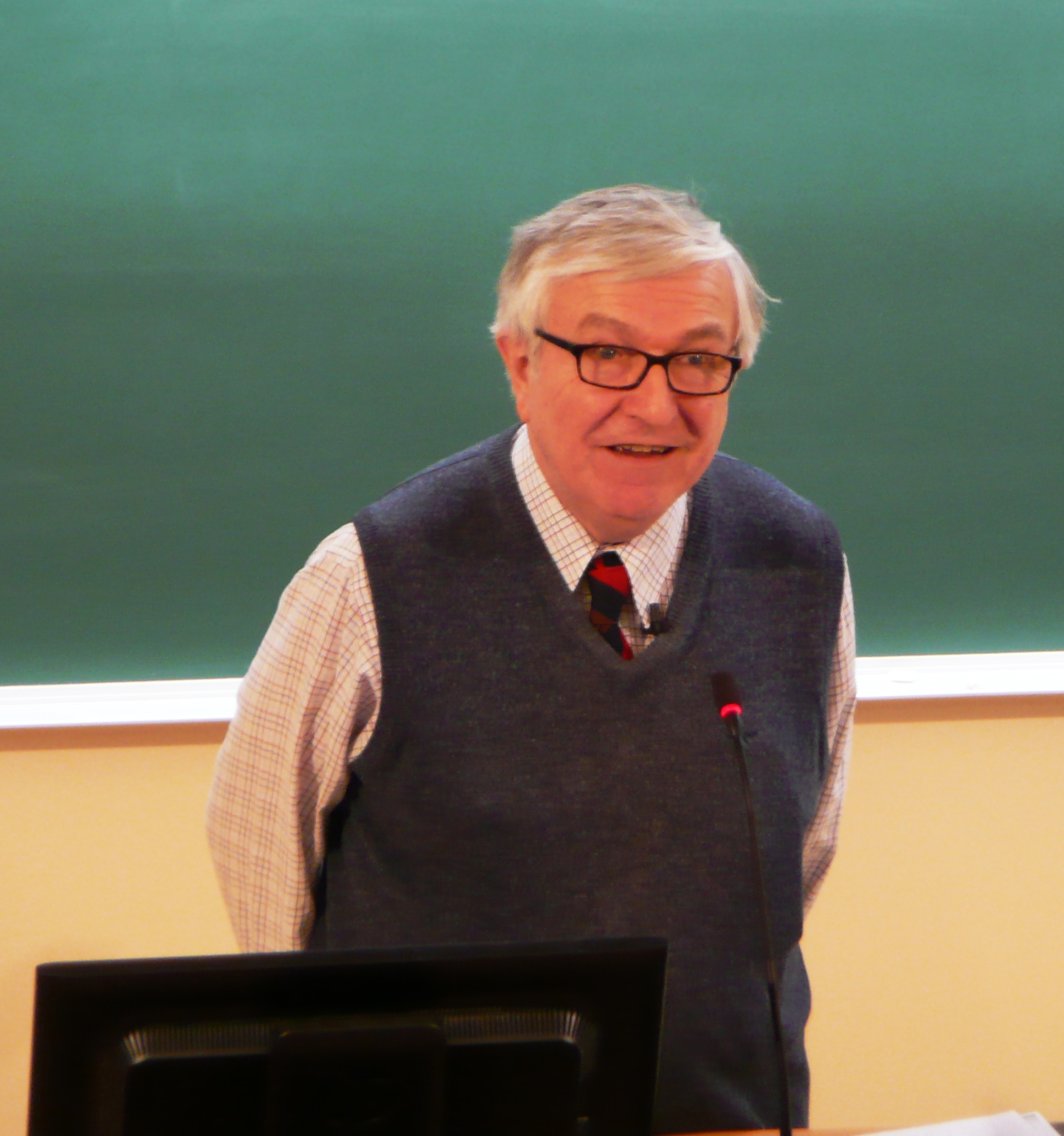
Stephen Bann at public lecture at the University of Tartu on 6 February 2013.

Stephen Bann (born 1 August 1942) is an emeritus professor of history of art at the University of Bristol.

He was made a Fellow of the British Academy in 1998, and named a Commander of the British Empire in 2004.

== Early life ==
Stephen Bann was born on 1 August 1942 in Manchester, England. He was educated at Winchester College and King's College, Cambridge, attaining his PhD in 1967.

== Academic career ==
Bann began his academic career at the University of Kent in 1967 as Lecturer in History. He subsequently held successive appointments as Senior Lecturer (1975–1980), Reader in Modern Cultural Studies (1980–1988), and Professor of Modern Cultural Studies (1988–2000). During more than three decades at Kent he was closely associated with the development of interdisciplinary cultural studies in Britain, integrating art history with literary criticism, history, philosophy, semiotics, and visual culture.

In 2000, Bann was appointed Professor of History of Art at the University of Bristol, where he remained until his retirement in 2008. Following his retirement he became Emeritus Professor of History of Art and Senior Research Fellow, continuing his research, writing, supervision, and public lectures.

Alongside his university appointments, Bann has held numerous prestigious visiting fellowships and professorships. He was Senior Fellow at the Canadian Centre for Architecture in Montreal (2003), Edmond J. Safra Visiting Professor at the Center for Advanced Study in the Visual Arts at the National Gallery of Art in Washington, D.C. (2005), Beatrix Farrand Distinguished Visiting Fellow at Dumbarton Oaks Research Library and Collection (2009), and Senior Visiting Scholar at the Yale Center for British Art between 2011 and 2014.

== Research and works ==
Stephen Bann's scholarship has centred on the relationship between art history, visual culture, and historical consciousness, making significant contributions to the study of how societies construct, represent, and interpret the past through images.

His work combines art history with literary theory, cultural studies, philosophy, semiotics, and museum studies, developing an interdisciplinary approach that has influenced the humanities since the 1970s. A recurring theme throughout his research is the concept of "historical-mindedness"—the ways in which visual representations, museums, collections, monuments, and reproductions shape collective understandings of history rather than merely documenting it. His studies have explored the interaction between visual representation and historical narrative across nineteenth-century Europe, particularly Britain and France.

Another major focus of Bann's research has been nineteenth-century French art, print culture, photography, and visual reproduction. He has examined artists including Paul Delaroche, Jean-Léon Gérôme, Jean-Auguste-Dominique Ingres, Paul Delaroche, Nadar, Achille Devéria, Hyacinthe Aubry-Lecomte, and Ferdinand Gaillard, investigating how paintings, engravings, lithographs, and early photography circulated ideas of history, nationalism, and memory.

Stephen Bann's work has been influential in focusing scholarly attention toward connections between the history of art and visual culture. The Clothing of Clio (1984), The Inventions of History (1990) and Romanticism and the Rise of History (1995) are concerned in particular with the deepening consciousness of history particular to the 19th century. The examples that Bann takes are explained by him not from a reductive art historical perspective, but through acknowledgement of such examples' location in a broader, metahistorical network. Visual sources, sometimes even unlikely or fragmentary ones, are valued by the author as still points of reference: "a visual example provides a support for the exegesis that the reader (spectator) can follow in a directly participatory way. Its very self-contained nature (as opposed to an extract from a text) enables it to generate cross-references as well as to provide a field for practical analysis" (Romanticism and the Rise of History).

Bann's interest in semiotics, the capacity of images to bear significance, is exemplified in Under the Sign: John Bargrave as Collector, Traveler, and Witness (1994), which comments on the peculiar history and status of a 17th-century cabinet of curiosity as an aid in the self-definition of the collector. Themes of travel and acquisition are brought together on these grounds to detect meaning. Similarly, in writing on the history of gardens, Bann has found cause to cite the Scottish poet Ian Hamilton Finlay, among others indicative of a contemporary imaginative predisposition.

In Ways Around Modernism (2006), Bann affirms his approach of appreciating commentaries or histories as themselves change- and epoch-making. The argument is completed with an assessment of Post-Modernism in connection with "the historical phenomenon of 'curiosity'" which, for Bann, "has resurfaced as a widespread and noteworthy feature of present-day art". By implication, Post-Modernism may thus reveal overlooked qualities in Modernism. An insistence upon the importance of looking and unstinting attentiveness, in addition to inter-disciplinary openness, is characteristic and influential in his writing.

Bann's book Parallel Lines: Printmakers, Painters and Photographers in Nineteenth-Century France (Yale University Press, 2001) was awarded the 2002 R. H. Gapper Book Prize by the UK Society for French Studies. This prize recognises the work as the best book published by a scholar working in Britain or Ireland in French studies in 2001.

Bann has also contributed translations of Roland Barthes's The Discourse of History and Julia Kristeva's Proust and the Sense of Time (1993).

== Selected publications ==
=== Books ===
- Bann, S., Gadney, R., Popper, F., & Steadman, P. (1966). Four essays on kinetic art. St Albans.
- Bann, S. (1967) Concrete Poetry: An International Anthology, London Magazine Editions.
- Bann, S. (1970). Experimental painting. Studio Vista.
- Bann, S. (Ed.). (1973). Russian formalism: A collection of articles and texts in translation (with J. E. Bowlt). Edinburgh.
- Bann, S. (Ed.). (1974). The tradition of constructivism. New York.
- Bann, S. (1984). The clothing of Clio: A study of the representation of history in nineteenth-century Britain and France. Cambridge University Press.
- Bann, S. (1989). The true vine: On visual representation and the Western tradition. Cambridge University Press.
- Bann, S. (1990). The inventions of history: Essays on the representation of the past. Manchester University Press.
- Bann, S., & Allen, W. (Eds.). (1991). Interpreting contemporary art. London.
- Bann, S., & Kumar, K. (Eds.). (1993). Utopias and the millennium. London.
- Bann, S. (Ed.). (1994). Frankenstein, creation and monstrosity. London.
- Bann, S. (1995). Under the sign: John Bargrave as collector, traveller, and witness. University of Michigan Press.
- Bann, S. (1995). The sculpture of Stephen Cox. London.
- Bann, S. (1995). Romanticism and the rise of history. Twayne Publishers.
- Bann, S. (1997). Paul Delaroche. Reaktion Books.
- Bann, S. (2001). Parallel lines: Printmakers, painters and photographers in nineteenth-century France. Yale University Press.
- Bann, S. (2003). Jannis Kounellis. London.
- Bann, S. (Ed.). (2004). The reception of Walter Pater in Europe. Continuum.
- Bann, S. (2006). Ways around modernism: Theories of modernism and postmodernism in the visual arts. Routledge.
- Bann, S. (Ed.). (2011). Art and the early photographic album. Yale University Press.
- Bann, S. (Ed.). (2012). Interlacing words and things: Bridging the nature–culture opposition in gardens and landscape. Dumbarton Oaks Research Library and Collection.
- Bann, S. (2013). Distinguished images: Prints in the visual economy of nineteenth-century France. Yale University Press.

=== Selected journal articles ===
- Bann, S. (2007). The studio as a scene of emulation: Marceline Desbordes-Valmore's L'Atelier d'un peintre. French Studies, 61(1), 26–35.
- Bann, S. (2008). Global, national and regional factors in French nineteenth-century painting. Acta Historiae Artium, 49, 11–24.
- Bann, S. (2008). "L'Atelier de Bervic" par Louis Henriquel-Dupont. Revue de la Bibliothèque nationale de France, 30, 57–62.
- Bann, S. (2009). "When I was a photographer": Nadar and history. History and Theory, 48(4), 95–111.
- Bann, S. (2010). A new Orientalism? History and Theory, 49(1), 130–138.
- Bann, S. (2010). Two kinds of historicism: Resurrection and restoration in French historical painting. Journal of the Philosophy of History, 4, 154–171.
