= Carolin Duttlinger =

German academic

Carolin Duttlinger (born 1976) is a German academic and Germanist. She studied at the University of Freiburg and at the University of Cambridge, where she completed her doctorate in 2003. She is Professor of German Literature and Culture at the University of Oxford and a fellow and tutor of Wadham College. In 2016 and 2019-20 she was external senior fellow at the Freiburg Institute for Advanced Studies.

Duttlinger's research focuses on German literature and thought from the eighteenth century to the present. She has published four books on the Prague writer Franz Kafka and co-directs the Oxford Kafka Research Centre together with Katrin Kohl, Barry Murnane and Ritchie Robertson. Duttlinger's research is interdisciplinary in nature, with a particular emphasis on Critical Theory and the relationship between literature and visual media. She is the editor of the Legenda book series Visual Culture. Her monograph Attention and Distraction in Modern German Literature, Thought, and Culture (2022) traces the history of attention and its interplay with distraction from the eighteenth century to present. Duttlinger has worked extensively on the German-Jewish thinker and critic Walter Benjamin. She is a member of the executive board of the International Walter Benjamin Society, and has spoken about Benjamin on radio and television.

== Select bibliography ==
- Kafka and Photography (Oxford University Press, 2008)
- Editor, with Johannes Birgfeld, Curiosity in German Literature and Culture from 1700 to the Present (Oxford German Studies, 2009)
- Editor, with Ben Morgan and Anthony Phelan, Walter Benjamins anthopologisches Denken (Rombach, 2012)
- The Cambridge Introduction to Franz Kafka (Cambridge University Press, 2013)
- Editor, with Silke Horstkotte, Weimar Photography in Context, special issue of Monatshefte, 109 (2017)
- Editor, Franz Kafka in Context (Cambridge University Press, 2018)
- Editor, with Kevin Hilliard and Charlie Louth, From the Enlightenment to Modernism: Three Centuries of German Modernism (Legenda, 2021)
- Attention and Distraction in Modern German Literature, Thought, and Culture (Oxford University Press, 2022)
