= La Bête humaine =

1890 novel by Émile Zola

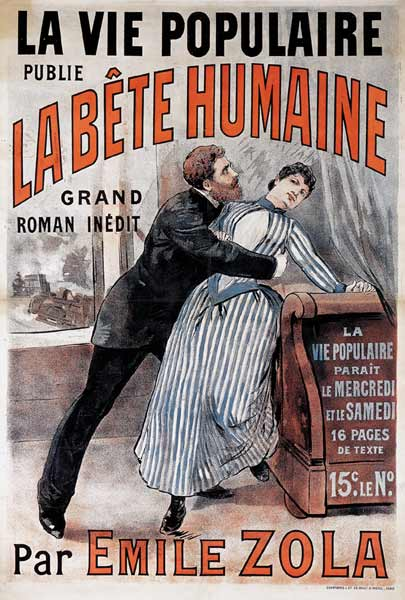
- Lithograph advertisement for La Bête humaine, 1890
- Author: Émile Zola
- Translator: Roger Pearson
- Language: French
- Series: Les Rougon-Macquart Histoire naturelle et sociale d'une famille sous le Second Empire
- Genre: Psychological thriller Crime fiction
- Set in: France
- Published: 1890 (Bibliothèque-Charpentier)
- Publication place: France
- English publication date: 1996 (Oxford University Press)
- Media type: Print (Serial, Hardcover, Paperback)
- Pages: 372 (paperback)
- Preceded by: The Masterpiece
- Followed by: Germinal

La Bête humaine (English: The Beast Within or The Beast in Man or The Monomaniac) is an 1890 novel by Émile Zola. It is the seventeenth book in Zola's Les Rougon-Macquart series. The story focuses on the lives and violent passions of railway workers who operate the line between Paris and Le Havre in the late 1860s. The novel is a tense psychological thriller and has been adapted multiple times for radio, television, and film.

== Characters ==
- Jacques Lantier: an engine driver who is the family link to the Les Rougon-Macquart series. He is the son of Gervaise Macquart (L'Assommoir), brother of Étienne Lantier (Germinal) and Claude Lantier (L'Œuvre), and half-brother of the eponymous Nana.
- Roubaud: deputy stationmaster at Le Havre
- Séverine: Roubaud's wife
- Judge Grandmorin: a prominent wealthy man – former director of the railway company and judge in the French judicial system – and a notorious womanizer
- Phasie: Lantier's sickly aunt who lives in an isolated house by the railway line outside Paris
- Flore: a railway employee, and Phasie's daughter, who is infatuated with Lantier
- Cabuche: a forestry worker who lives near Phasie
- Pecqueux: the fireman on Lantier's train

== Plot summary ==
During a train layover in Paris, Roubaud comes to suspect that his wife Séverine had an affair years ago with Judge Grandmorin, her patron when she was an orphaned teenager. Roubaud forces a confession from her about being seduced by Grandmorin. In a jealous rage, Roubaud makes her write a note to the judge, asking for a rendezvous on that evening's express from Paris. It is the same train that Roubaud and Séverine are taking back to Le Havre.

Lantier is afflicted with hereditary madness that causes his sexual desires to turn into fits of violence against women. His relationship to his engine, which he affectionately dubs "La Lison", provides him some relief. While staying in Paris to have "Lison" repaired, he visits his Aunt Phasie. When he encounters her daughter Flore, his passions are inflamed and trigger his homicidal mania. He feels on the verge of stabbing her, but restrains himself and runs away. Standing near the railway line, Lantier observes the express from Paris go by. Through a passing window, he glimpses a man holding a knife, bent over another man. Lantier later finds Grandmorin's body beside the track with his throat cut.

Roubaud and Séverine are suspects since they were on the train with Grandmorin and will inherit some of his property. Lantier sees Roubaud at the police station and privately thinks that he resembles the man with the knife, but when questioned by the police says he cannot positively identify the murderer. The magistrate, pursuing a false lead against Cabuche, dismisses Roubaud and Séverine. Even though they have been cleared of the crime, their marriage becomes strained. They hide the cash and watch they stole from Grandmorin under a floorboard in their apartment. As "insurance" against a change in Lantier's eyewitness testimony, Roubaud cultivates a friendship with the engine driver and encourages his wife to do so.

Séverine and Lantier begin an affair, at first clandestinely but then more openly until they are caught by Roubaud. Despite his previous jealousy, Roubaud seems unmoved; he spends less time at home and turns to gambling.

One night, Séverine admits to Lantier that Roubaud murdered Grandmorin, and she assisted. Lantier feels the return of his own urge to kill. The next morning, he leaves the apartment to kill the first woman he meets. After choosing a victim, he is seen by someone he knows and abandons the idea. He is relieved and hopes his murderous inclinations will plague him no longer.

Séverine discovers Roubaud has taken all the hidden cash stolen from Grandmorin to pay off gambling debts. She suggests to Lantier that they sell the property she and Roubaud inherited from Grandmorin, and use it to escape to New York where Lantier has heard of a business opportunity. Roubaud is the only obstacle to this new life, and they decide to kill him. They approach him late at night when he is doing his rounds as a watchman at the train station, figuring the murder will be attributed to robbers. At the last moment, however, Lantier loses his nerve.

Meanwhile, the lovesick Flore sees Lantier regularly pass her house driving the train. She notices that Séverine always rides on his Friday morning express to Paris. Flore concludes that the two are having an affair and grows fiercely jealous, wishing to kill them both. She hatches a plot to derail Lantier's train while Séverine is on board. Flore seizes her chance when Cabuche leaves his wagon and horses unattended near the railway line. She leads the horses onto the tracks seconds before "Lison" arrives. In the resulting crash, numerous people die, but Séverine is unhurt and Lantier is moderately injured. Wracked by guilt, Flore commits suicide by walking in front of a train.

Séverine nurses Lantier back to health. She convinces him they must kill Roubaud, and they concoct a plan. But Lantier's atavistic madness returns, and when Séverine tries to make love with him shortly before Roubaud is due to arrive, he murders her. Cabuche finds Séverine's body and is accused of killing her at Roubaud's behest. Both men are put on trial for the crime, and for the murder of Grandmorin. They are convicted and sentenced to life imprisonment.

Lantier begins driving again, but his newly assigned engine is just a number to him. He initiates an affair with Pecqueux's girlfriend. Lantier drives a train carrying troops towards the front at the outbreak of the Franco-Prussian War. The resentment between Lantier and Pecqueux breaks out into a fight as the train is travelling at full steam. Both fall to their deaths, and the train loaded with soldiers hurtles driverless through the night.

== Themes and criticism ==
Zola translator Leonard Tancock wrote that La Bête humaine is one of the author's most violent and pessimistic novels:

haunted by the theory he held at this stage of his career that "love and death, possessing and killing, are the dark foundations of the human soul".... [the novel] is a curious hybrid of two quite different themes. The first theme is...a study of homicide but also of the French judicial system, its corruption and inherent weakness; and the second is an interesting tale of the world of the railways, the organization and running of a main line and the life of its employees.

Carl Dahlstrom took issue with Zola scholars, such as biographer Matthew Josephson, who suggested that the "beast" in the title referred to the locomotive engine. Dahlstrom noted that "Zola deliberately selected a human beast to carry the leading role in the novel.... He is the sadist Jacques Lantier, a member of the Rougon-Macquart family, who reverts to the brutal caveman under certain conditions of emotional stress. Finally, no argument remains when we read in Zola's plans for the novel that Jacques Lantier is 'une variété de la bête humaine.'"

In an article in Nineteenth-Century French Studies, Robert Viti pointed out that Zola often manipulated temporal rhythm in his novels, never more so than in La Bête humaine:

[Zola] alternates the orderly succession of linear time, most often represented by the uninterrupted ticking of a clock, with the intermittent disruption of this flow by violent and chaotic temporal eruptions, breaks, fissures. At such break points, time slows down or stops or, conversely, speeds up recklessly. Accompanying the disruption of ordinary time is the realization during such moments that experiences are richer and deeper; the emotional pitch is sharper, feelings are more intense.

Viti interpreted these breaks in the novel as eruptions of unpredictability from ordinariness, of disorder from order: "Underlying everyday, orderly life is another world, another Life, at once psychological and primitive, one of passion, crime and risk." When recounting to Lantier the details of the murder of Grandmorin, Séverine says, "I lived more in that minute than in the whole of my previous life."

== Publication history ==
- 14 November 1889, first three chapters appear in the weekly magazine La Vie populaire; the rest of the book is also serialized, with the final installments published on 2 March 1890.
- March 1890, La Bête humaine published in book form in Paris by Bibliothèque-Charpentier.

== English Translations ==
=== Expurgated ===
1. c. 1891, The Human Beast (tr. G. D. Cox, T. B. Peterson)
2. 1901, The Monomaniac, translated and edited with a preface by Edward Vizetelly, London: Hutchinson & Co.
3. 1937: The Human Beast (tr. Louis Colman, Julien Press)

=== Unexpurgated ===
1. 1956: The Beast in Man, translated by Alec Brown (Elek)
2. 1968, The Beast in Man (translated by Robert Godfrey Goodyear and P.J.R. Wright), London: Signet Classic
3. 1977, La Bête humaine (translated by Leonard Tancock), London: Penguin, ISBN 978-0-140-44327-1
4. 1996, La Bête humaine (translated by Roger Pearson), Oxford: Oxford University Press, ISBN 978-0-199-53866-9
5. 2007, The Beast Within (translated by Roger Whitehouse), London: Penguin, ISBN 978-0-140-44963-1

== Adaptations ==
- Die Bestie im Menschen, 1921 German silent film, directed by Ludwig Wolff
- La Bête humaine, 1938 movie directed by Jean Renoir, starring Jean Gabin
- Human Desire, 1954 movie based on the novel, and directed by Fritz Lang, starring Glenn Ford
- La Bestia humana, 1957 Argentine movie, directed by Daniel Tinayre
- La Bête Humaine, 1993 BBC radio adaptation in three parts
- Cruel Train, 1995 British TV movie, directed by Malcolm McKay
