= Michael Knox Beran =

American lawyer and history writer

- Education: Columbia University (BA); Cambridge University (MPhil); Yale University (JD)
- Occupations: History writer and lawyer
- Known for: WASPS: The Splendors and Miseries of an American Aristocracy (2021)
- Website: michaelknoxberan.com

Michael Knox Beran is an American lawyer and author of American political history. He is known for authoring WASPS: The Splendors and Miseries of an American Aristocracy (2021).

== Early life and education ==
Beran attended Columbia University where he earned his bachelor of arts magna cum laude in 1988. He subsequently received a Master of Philosophy from Cambridge University in 1990 before earning his JD degree from Yale Law School in 1993. He practiced law at various New York law firms afterwards.

== Writing career ==
=== Early career ===
In 1998, Beran published his debut book The Last Patrician: Bobby Kennedy and the End of American Aristocracy, a biography of Robert F. Kennedy. It was published to coincide with the anniversary of Kennedy's death. The book received mostly positive reviews, but was noted for its controversial stance on the life of Kennedy. George F. Will, in a review for the New York Times, wrote that it "has an unusually high ratio of provocations per page. Some readers will angrily throw it across the room. But they will retrieve it, and continue reading, avidly".

He published Jefferson's Demons: Portrait of a Restless Mind in 2003, which received mixed reviews. Andrew Burstein of The Journal of American History considered the book to be a work of Classical prose rather than a history, and wrote that "one comes to wonder, when does informed speculation become mere pretense?". This was followed by Forge of Empires: Three Revolutionary Statesmen and the World They Made, 1861–1871 in 2007.

=== WASPS ===
In 2021, Beran published WASPS: The Splendors and Miseries of an American Aristocracy. The book is based around the concept of WASPs (White Anglo-Saxon Protestants) in the United States, but uses a looser definition that includes non-Protestant from affluent, colonial backgrounds. Karen Sandstrom summarized Beran's definition of WASPs as being "typically found at the intersection of patrician bloodlines, political and cultural influence, and a desire for completeness."

It follows the rise of WASPs in American culture and politics during the Reconstruction era and their decline into the 21st century. The book argues that the postwar generation of WASPs were wracked with mental illness and addiction, which contributed to the fall of the American upper class and families like the Kennedys and Roosevelts. The book received a mostly positive response from critics for its humor, writing style, and research. However, it received some criticism for its pacing and "chaotic" chapter organization. Mark McGinness of The Spectator praised Beran's depth of research and "acerbic asides and witty one-liners". Paula Byrne of The Sunday Times described it as "meticulously researched, exhaustive, slightly bonkers, a smorgasbord of delicious and outrageous details". It was included on Town & Country's Best Releases of August 2021.

== Bibliography ==
- The Last Patrician: Bobby Kennedy and the End of the American Aristocracy. St. Martin's Books, 1998
- Jefferson's Demons: Portrait of a Restless Mind. Free Press, 2003
- Forge of Empires 1861-1871: Three Revolutionary Statesmen and the World They Made. Free Press, 2007
- Pathology of the Elites: How the Arrogant Classes Plan to Run Your Life. Rowman & Littlefield, 2010
- WASPS: The Splendors and Miseries of an American Aristocracy. Pegasus Books. 2021
