= Kate Tunstall (academic) =

British academic in the field of French literature

- Born: 1970 (age 55–56)

Academic background
- Education: Sidney Sussex College, Cambridge; Hughes Hall, Cambridge

Academic work
- Discipline: Literary historian
- Sub-discipline: French literature
- Institutions: Worcester College, Oxford; Faculty of Medieval and Modern Languages, University of Oxford

Professor Kate Elizabeth Tunstall (born 1970) is an academic in the field of French literature. She is a fellow of Worcester College, Oxford, where she also served as interim provost from 2019 to 2021.

== Early life ==
Born in Wandsworth in September 1970, Tunstall was educated at a comprehensive school in South London, then at Sidney Sussex College, Cambridge, where she graduated B.A. in French and German, after a year at the Paul Valéry University in Montpellier. In 1995 she gained the M.Phil. degree at Cambridge, with a thesis on the 18th-century French philosopher and encyclopaedist Denis Diderot.

== Career ==
Tunstall was a Kennedy Fellow at Harvard from 1995 to 1996 and arrived at Oxford as an academic in 1997. In October 1999, she graduated as a Doctor of Philosophy from Hughes Hall, Cambridge.

She is a Fellow of Worcester College, Oxford, and an academic in the Faculty of Medieval and Modern Languages at the University. She was preparing to take up appointment as Vice Provost, when in March 2019, due to the early retirement of Sir Jonathan Bate, she was appointed as Interim Provost of Worcester College, with effect from October. Her term ended in July 2021 with the appointment of David Isaac as Provost.

Shortly after her appointment as interim Provost, Tunstall attempted to put an end to the traditional custom of students standing as Fellows enter to sit at high table during formal hall, and also to the saying of grace before the meal, which led to a backlash. In an online referendum of college students, 155 students voted, with 130 in favour of maintaining the traditions, 20 against, and five abstaining. She stated that her change to the traditional customs was in line with the college's "commitment to equality as an educational charity".

== Bibliography ==
=== Books ===
- The Place of Painting in Diderot's Philosophical and Æsthetic Writings, University of Cambridge, 1999
- Blindness and Enlightenment: An Essay. Bloomsbury Publishing. 2011.

=== Articles ===
- Tunstall, Kate, ‘Sexe, mensonges et colonies: les discours de l’amour dans le Supplément au Voyage de Bougainville’, Littératures classiques, 69 (2009), 17–34.
- Tunstall, Kate, ‘Diderot-Voltaire: la coédition comme coalition’, French Studies Bulletin, 38.143 (2017), 24–30.

Academic offices
Preceded by Sir Jonathan Bate	Interim Provost of Worcester College, Oxford; 2019–2021	Succeeded by David Isaac
