= Simon Gaunt =

British academic

- Born: 4 July 1959
- Died: 4 December 2021 (aged 62)
- Education: University of Warwick
- Occupation: Academic

Simon Gaunt FBA (4 July 1959 – 4 December 2021) was a professor of French literature at King's College London, where he was head of the French Department and head of the School of Humanities. He was past president of the Society for French Studies (2006-8), a Fellow of King's College, London from 2015 and an Honorary Fellow of St. Catharine's College, Cambridge from 2016.

Gaunt did his graduate studies at the University of Warwick and then taught at the University of Cambridge before moving to King's College to take up an established chair in 1998.

Simon attended Bishop Wordsworth's School, Salisbury 1970 to 1977, living in Godshill, Hampshire at that time.

In July 2018 Gaunt was elected Fellow of the British Academy (FBA).

He died of complications from treatment for myeloma in December, 2021.

== Publications ==
- Marco Polo's 'Le Devisement du Monde'. Narrative Voice, Language and Diversity Gallica, Vol. 31 (D.S. Brewer, 2013)
- Martyrs to Love: Love and Death in Medieval French and Occitan Courtly Literature (Oxford: OUP, 2006)
- Gender and Genre in Medieval French Literature (Cambridge: Cambridge University Press, 1995; pbk 2005)
- Retelling the Tale: an Introduction to Medieval French Literature (London: Duckworth, 2001)
- (with Ruth Harvey and Linda Paterson) Marcabru: a Critical Edition (Cambridge: D.S. Brewer, 2000)
- (with Sarah Kay) The Troubadours: an Introduction (Cambridge: Cambridge University Press, 1999)
- Troubadours and Irony (Cambridge: Cambridge University Press, 1989)
