= French Studies =

- Discipline: French language, French literature
- Language: English, French
- Edited by: Timothy Unwin

Publication details
- History: 1947-present
- Publisher: Liverpool University Press on behalf of the Society for French Studies
- Frequency: Quarterly

Standard abbreviations
- ISO 4: Fr. Stud.

Indexing
- ISSN: 0016-1128 (print); 1468-2931 (web)
- LCCN: 52052554
- OCLC no.: 185432992

Links
- Journal homepage; Online access; Online archive

French Studies is a quarterly peer-reviewed academic journal published by Oxford University Press on behalf of the Society for French Studies. It was established in 1947 and covers all periods of French and francophone literature and culture. Articles are published in English or French. The journal is accompanied by a sister publication for shorter articles called The French Studies Bulletin.

The editor-in-chief is Timothy Unwin (University of Bristol). From 1987 to 1997, its editor-in-chief was Alan Raitt.

The journal was formerly published by Oxford University Press.

== Abstracting and indexing ==
The journal is abstracted and indexed in:

- Linguistic Bibliography/Bibliographie Linguistique
- Bibliography of the History of Art
- British Humanities Index
- Historical Abstracts
- MLA International Bibliography
- Linguistics & Language Behavior Abstracts
- ProQuest databases
