= David Isaac, Baron Isaac =

British solicitor and provost

The Right Honourable The Lord Isaac CBE

Provost of Worcester College, Oxford
- Incumbent
- Assumed office 1 July 2021
- Preceded by: Professor Kate Tunstall

Chair of the Court of Governors of University of the Arts London
- Incumbent
- Assumed office 2018

Chair of the Henry Moore Foundation
- Incumbent
- Assumed office December 2024
- Preceded by: Sir Nigel Carrington

Member of the House of Lords
- Lord Temporal
- Life peerage 19 January 2026

Personal details
- Party: Labour
- Education: Trinity Hall, Cambridge; Wolfson College, Oxford
- Awards: Honorary Fellow of St Catharine's College, Cambridge

David Isaac, Baron Isaac, CBE is a British solicitor and Provost of Worcester College, Oxford, where he took office in July 2021. He chairs the Court of Governors of University of the Arts London (2018–present) and the Henry Moore Foundation (2024–present). He is also a trustee of Cumberland Lodge.

Isaac was a partner at law firm Pinsent Masons. He chaired the lesbian and gay rights charity Stonewall from 2003 to 2012 and chaired the contemporary art gallery Modern Art Oxford for almost two decades. He was also a director of the Diana Princess of Wales Memorial Fund (2005–2014), the Big Lottery Fund (2014–2018) and was a trustee of 14-18 NOW (2016–2019). Isaac was appointed as the chair of the Equality and Human Rights Commission in 2016, serving in that capacity until August 2020.

== Early life ==
Isaac was born in Wales and attended King Henry VIII Grammar School in Abergavenny. He went on to study law at Trinity Hall, Cambridge and socio-legal studies at Wolfson College, Oxford. He attended the College of Law in Guildford to pass the Solicitors Final Examination (1979–80).

== Pinsent Masons ==
Isaac was a partner at Pinsent Masons law firm from 2000 to 2021. He was Head of the firm's advanced manufacturing and technology sector from 2014 – 2019 and Chair of the Pinsent Masons' Diversity and Inclusion group.

== Equality and Human Rights Commission ==
Isaac was appointed as Chair of the Equality and Human Rights Commission in 2016. He said that the Commission would use its legal powers more, do more for disability rights and make sure that human rights were protected during Brexit. His tenure came to an end in August 2020, and his initial replacement was interim chair Caroline Waters (previously deputy chair).

In 2021 Isaac claimed that the Equality and Human Rights Commission was "being undermined by political pressure" by the Second Johnson ministry.

== Stonewall ==
During his time as chair of Stonewall, the charity lobbied to secure legislative change, such as the abolition of Section 28 and the introduction of Civil Partnerships.

== Honours ==
Isaac was appointed a Commander of the Most Excellent Order of the British Empire (CBE) in the 2011 Queen's Birthday Honours list for services to equality and diversity and was ranked 36th in the Financial Times' OUTstanding Top 100 LGBT+ executives in October 2018. He was made an Honorary Fellow of St Catharine's College, Cambridge in May 2024. As part of the 2025 Political Peerages, Isaac was nominated to receive a life peerage to sit in the House of Lords as a Labour peer; he was created as Baron Isaac, of Abergavenny in the County of Monmouthshire on 19 January 2026.

Academic offices
Preceded by Professor Kate Tunstall	Provost of Worcester College, Oxford; 2021–present	Succeeded by Incumbent
