= The Real Jane Austen =

The Real Jane Austen: A Life in Small Things
- First edition cover
- Author: Paula Byrne
- Genre: Biography
- Published: 2013
- Publisher: Harper Perennial
- ISBN: 9780061999093

The Real Jane Austen: A Life in Small Things is a biography of novelist Jane Austen by the writer Paula Byrne first published in 2013. The biography does not follow her life chronologically; rather her story is told around events or objects in Austen's life as the starting point to describe the famous English author.

It received several positive reviews after first publication.

== Synopsis ==
This biography of Jane Austen is organized by objects or scenes in Austen's life, rather than chronologically. Austen's experiences with life are shown to be broader than that of a woman who did not travel far and never left her home country. Rather, she knew people in her own neighborhood and coming from the British Empire in the tumultuous times of the French Revolution and the long wars with France following that Revolution and was involved in major issues at home, such as slavery in England, and the more challenging question of slavery in the Empire beyond the island of Great Britain.

== Reviews ==
This biography received several positive reviews for the lively writing and the manner of presenting Austen's life. The author uses well-known sources and adds some original research as well as presenting original views on the famous author.

This book was reviewed by Helen Zaltzman in The Observer and by Simon Callow in The Guardian. Susan Elkin reviewed it in The Independent and Philip Womack wrote a review in The Telegraph.

Maxwell Carter describes the prior major biographies and collections of the letters of Jane Austen to set the contrast with this book, with its "object-based approach" in lieu of the chronological approach; "As with many worthy experiments, the results are mixed; some sections are vividly persuasive, others cursory or too speculative." A strong aspect of this approach to Austen's biography is "affirming her girlish delight in the form [theatricals] and its substantial influence on her dialogue and narrative design, namely the pivotal set piece in Mansfield Park." The section in the book on slavery reveals Austen to be well aware of events current in her lifetime and knowledgeable of major public characters, some of whom she met: it "is better still, establishing links between Austen’s protagonists and contemporary figures, her pointed references and contemporary events, which highlight her supposedly oblivious fiction’s sharp views on the slave trade." His conclusion is that given the scarcity of personal information on Jane Austen, "Byrne’s method is an effective alternative, its incisive conclusions mitigating stretches weakened by enigmatic silences or doubtful claims. At times, we almost succeed in glimpsing her cagey subject".

An interview aired on NPR calls this book a "dynamic new biography" and a "bit of an experiment" that reveals Jane Austen to be a lively woman, not the quiet country person described in other biographies. Author Paula Byrne said the idea to use objects as the organizing base for the biography arose from reading the scene in Mansfield Park when main character Fanny Price is looking about her room, considering each everyday object and what it meant to her.

There is a permalink at the Library of Congress.
