= Clive Scott (linguist) =

British language and translation scholar

Clive Scott is a British scholar of modern languages and translation studies. He is emeritus Professor of European Literature at the University of East Anglia (UEA) and a Fellow of the British Academy. His work spans French poetry, comparative poetics, photography and its relationship with writing, and the philosophy and practice of literary translation.

== Early life and education ==
Scott was educated at Bishop's Stortford College (1956–1961) and later attended St John's College, Oxford, where he earned degrees in French and German (MA, 1965), General and Comparative Literature (MPhil, 1967), and a DPhil in 1975. His doctoral thesis focused on comparative versification, specifically the role of line-endings in fixed forms and free verse.

== Academic career ==
Scott joined the University of East Anglia in 1967 as an Assistant Lecturer and became a founding member of the French sector in the School of European Studies. He was appointed Lecturer in 1970, promoted to Reader in 1988, and became Professor of European Literature in 1991. He was made emeritus Professor in 2008.

He also chaired course-validating committees for several external institutions and served as acting director of the British Centre for Literary Translation (2003–2004). From 2004 to 2005, he was Head of the School of Literature and Creative Writing.

He has held editorial or advisory positions with a number of publications and organizations, including Parnasse, New Comparison, the British Centre for Literary Translation, Second Sight, the Half-Tone Press, Open Book Publishers, Thinking Verse, and the Transcript series published by Legenda.

Scott was elected a Fellow of the British Academy in 1994 and became emeritus in 2023. In 2008, he was named Ordre des Palmes Académiques by the French government. He served as President of the Modern Humanities Research Association from 2014 to 2015.

== Scholarly work and research ==
Scott's early scholarship focused on comparative poetics and versification, particularly in relation to French poetry.

His DPhil thesis explored line-endings in fixed forms and free verse across languages, contributing to cross-cultural understandings of poetic structure and rhythm. He later examined the formal and expressive qualities of French verse in works such as Vers libre: The Emergence of Free Verse in France, 1886–1914 (1990).

In the late 1990s, Scott turned to the relationship between photography and writing, analyzing their different expressive modes and mutual interferences. His monographs The Spoken Image: Photography and Language (1999) and Street Photography: From Atget to Cartier-Bresson (2007) reflect an interdisciplinary approach, drawing on literary theory, visual studies, and cultural history.

His book Channel Crossings: French and English Poetry in Dialogue 1550–2000 (2002) traces reciprocal influences between poetic traditions and was awarded the R.H. Gapper Book Prize in 2003. Literary Translation and the Rediscovery of Reading (2012), based on his 2010 Clark Lectures at the University of Cambridge, emphasizes the act of translation as a mode of critical and creative reading. Translating the Perception of Text (2012), which received a Gapper commendation, explores the perceptual and cognitive dimensions of translation. Scott's more recent theoretical work incorporates ecological and phenomenological frameworks, influenced by thinkers such as Henri Bergson, Jakob von Uexküll, and Maurice Merleau-Ponty.

== Selected publications ==
=== Books authored ===
- Scott, Clive (1980). French Verse-Art:A Study. Cambridge University Press. p. 252. ISBN 9780521226899.
- Scott, Clive (11 September 1986). A Question of Syllables. Cambridge University Press. doi:10.1017/cbo9780511519574. ISBN 978-0-521-32584-4.
- Scott, Clive (1988). The riches of rhyme: studies in French verse. Oxford: Clarendon Pr. ISBN 978-0-19-815853-0.
- Scott, Clive (5 April 1990). Vers Libre. Oxford University PressOxford. doi:10.1093/acprof:oso/9780198151593.001.0001. ISBN 0-19-815159-4.
- Scott, Clive (5 August 1993). Reading the Rhythm. Oxford University PressOxford. doi:10.1093/acprof:oso/9780198158820.001.0001. ISBN 0-19-815882-3.
- Scott, Clive (1998). The poetics of French verse: studies in reading. Oxford: Clarendon. ISBN 978-0-19-815944-5.
- Scott, Clive (1999). The spoken image: photography and language. London: Reaktion. ISBN 978-1-86189-032-0.
- Scott, Clive (2000). Translating Baudelaire. Exeter: University of Exeter Press. ISBN 978-0-85989-658-0.
- Scott, Clive (2002). Channel crossings: French and English poetry in dialogue, 1550-2000. Oxford: European Humanities Research Centre. ISBN 978-1-900755-54-2.
- Scott, Clive (2006). Translating Rimbaud's Illuminations. Exeter, U.K: University of Exeter Press. ISBN 978-0-85989-769-3.
- Scott, Clive (2007). Street Photography: From Atget to Cartier-Bresson. I.B.Tauris. doi:10.5040/9780755604210. ISBN 978-1-84511-223-3.
- Scott, Clive (2012). Literary translation and the rediscovery of reading. Cambridge: Cambridge University Press. ISBN 978-1-107-02230-0.
- Scott, Clive (2012). Translating the perception of text: literary translation and phenomenology. London: Legenda, Modern Humanities Research Association and Maney Publishing. doi:10.4324/9781315084619. ISBN 978-1-315-08461-9.
- Scott, Clive (2014). Translating Apollinaire. Exeter: University of Exeter Press. ISBN 978-0-85989-895-9.
- Scott, Clive (2018). The work of literary translation. Cambridge New York, NY: Cambridge University Press. ISBN 978-1-108-44581-8.
- Scott, Clive (2023). The Philosophy of Literary Translation: Dialogue, Movement, Ecology (1st ed.). Cambridge: Cambridge University Press. ISBN 978-1-009-38995-2.
- Scott, Clive (15 May 2025). The Tremors of Translation: An Edition of Voltaire's Poème sur le désastre de Lisbonne (1756). Modern Humanities Research Association. ISBN 978-1-83954-391-3.

=== Edited volumes ===
- Scott, Clive, ed. (1983). Anthologie Eluard. Methuen's twentieth century French texts. London: Methuen Educational. ISBN 978-0-423-50880-2.
- Scott, Clive; Warr, Nick, eds. (29 September 2023). Shadows of Reality: A Catalogue of WG Sebald's Photographic Materials. Boiler House Press.
- Scott, Clive; Moore, Andrew, eds. (1 August 2025). Translating John Crome : Through Sight to Insight. UEA Publishing Project. p. 256. ISBN 9781915812728.
