= Sarah Kay (professor of French) =

- Known for: Medieval French literature and philosophy
- Awards: Fellow of the British Academy (2004)

Academic background
- Education: University of Oxford

Academic work
- Discipline: French literature
- Institutions: University of Liverpool, University of Cambridge, New York University

Sarah Kay is a professor of French at New York University.

== Education ==
Kay was a student in the UK at the University of Oxford.

== Career ==
Her teaching career commenced at the University of Liverpool before transitioning to the University of Cambridge. She served as the head of the department from 1996 to 2001 and as Director of Studies at Girton College, Cambridge, from 2003 to 2005. Kay has been a fellow of the British Academy since 2004 and was awarded a D.Litt. (Cambridge) in 2005.

== Publications ==
- Parrots and Nightingales: Troubadour Quotations and the Development of European Poetry (Penn University Press, 2013)
- (with Adrian Armstrong) Knowing Poetry: Verse in Medieval France from the Rose to the Rhétoriqueurs (Cornell University Press, 2011)
- The Place of Thought: The Complexity of One in Late Medieval French Didactic Poetry (Penn University Press, 2007)
- Žižek: A Critical Introduction (Cambridge: Polity, 2003)
- (with Malcolm Bowie and Terence Cave) A Short History of French Literature (Oxford University Press, 2003)
- Courtly Contradictions (Stanford University Press, 2001)
- (with Simon Gaunt) The Troubadours. An Introduction (Cambridge University Press, 1999)
- The Chansons de geste in the Age of Romance (Oxford University Press, 1995)
- (as co-editor with Miri Rubin) Framing Medieval Bodies (Manchester University Press, 1994)
- (as editor) Raoul de Cambrai (Oxford University Press, 1992)
- Subjectivity in Troubadour Poetry (Cambridge University Press, 1990)
