= Roger Pearson (literary scholar) =

British literary scholar (born 1949)

Roger Pearson is an emeritus professor of French at the University of Oxford and an emeritus fellow of The Queen's College, Oxford. His research focuses on eighteenth and nineteenth century French literature and has worked particularly on Voltaire, Stendhal, Émile Zola, Guy de Maupassant, Stéphane Mallarmé and Charles Baudelaire. Pearson has also worked as a French to English translator.

Pearson did his undergraduate and postgraduate studies at Exeter College, Oxford. He then became a College Lecturer at The Queen's College in October 1973. In 1977 he became a full University Lecturer and was appointed professor in 1997. In 2005 he was appointed Officer in the Ordre des Palmes Académiques by the French government and he was elected as a Fellow of the British Academy in 2009.

Pearson's book Mallarmé and Circumstance: The Translation of Silence was awarded the 2005 R. H. Gapper Book Prize by the UK Society for French Studies. This prize recognises the work as the best book published by a scholar working in Britain or Ireland in French studies in 2004. He won the Gapper Prize again in 2017 for his book Unacknowledged Legislators: The Poet as Lawgiver in Post-Revolutionary France.

== Publications ==
Authored Books

- Stendhal's Violin: A Novelist and his Reader (Oxford: Clarendon Press, 1988)
- The Fables of Reason: A Study of Voltaire's 'contes philosophiques' (Oxford: Clarendon Press, 1993)
- Unfolding Mallarmé: The Development of a Poetic Art (Oxford: Clarendon Press, 1996)
- Mallarmé and Circumstance: The Translation of Silence (Oxford: Clarendon Press, 2004)
- Voltaire Almighty: A Life in Pursuit of Freedom (London: Bloomsbury, 2005)
- Stéphane Mallarmé (London: Reaktion Books, 2010)
- Unacknowledged Legislators: The Poet as Lawgiver in Post-Revolutionary France: Chateaubriand – Staël – Lamartine – Hugo – Vigny (Oxford: Oxford University Press, 2016)
- The Beauty of Baudelaire: The Poet as Alternative Lawgiver (Oxford: Oxford University Press, 2021)

Translations

- Zola, La Bête humaine, Oxford World's Classics (Oxford University Press, 1996)
- Zola, Germinal, Penguin Classics (London: Penguin, 2004)
- Voltaire, Candide and Other Stories, Oxford World's Classics (Oxford University Press, 2006)
- Maupassant, Une Vie, Oxford World's Classics (Oxford University Press, 1999)
