= Jonathan Bate =

British author, scholar and critic

Professor Sir Jonathan Bate CBE FBA FRSL
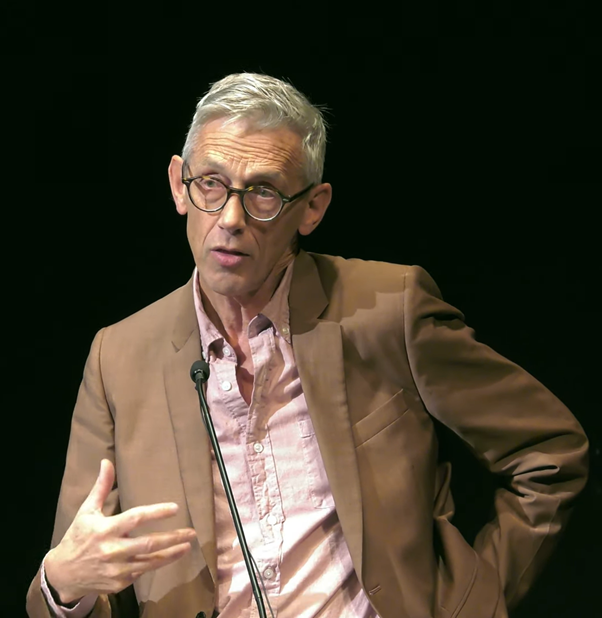
- Bate in 2019
- Born: 26 June 1958 (age 68); Kent, United Kingdom
- Occupations: Academic; historian; literary critic; biographer; broadcaster
- Known for: Shakespeare, Romanticism, Ecocriticism
- Spouse: Paula Byrne
- Awards: Hawthornden Prize, James Tait Black Prize

Academic background
- Education: Sevenoaks School
- Alma mater: St Catharine's College, Cambridge; Harvard University

Academic work
- Institutions: Trinity Hall, Cambridge; University of Liverpool; University of Warwick; Worcester College, Oxford; Arizona State University
- Main interests: Shakespeare, Early Modern Britain, Romanticism, Ecocriticism, Biography

Sir Andrew Jonathan Bate (born 26 June 1958) is a British academic, biographer, literary critic, broadcaster, and scholar, known for his work on Shakespeare, Romanticism, and ecocriticism. He is currently Foundation Professor of Environmental Humanities and Regents Professor of English at Arizona State University, and a Senior Research Fellow at Worcester College, Oxford, where he served as Provost from 2011 to 2019.

From 2017 to 2019 he was also Gresham Professor of Rhetoric at Gresham College in London. Bate was knighted in 2015 for services to literary scholarship and higher education. He has authored major biographies of the poets John Clare, Ted Hughes, and William Wordsworth, as well as influential works on Shakespeare. He has written and presented extensively for BBC radio, and wrote the one-man play Being Shakespeare for actor Simon Callow.

Bate is a Fellow of the British Academy and the Royal Society of Literature. He is married to author Paula Byrne.

== Academic and theatrical career ==
Bate was educated at Sevenoaks School, at the time when it was a selective Kent County Council funded grammar school, and St Catharine's College, Cambridge, where he was the inaugural T. R. Henn Scholar and a winner of the University Charles Oldham Shakespeare Scholarship. After graduating with a top double first-class degree, he spent a year as a Harkness Fellow at Harvard University before returning to Cambridge to complete a PhD degree on Shakespeare and the Romantic imagination, supervised by Richard Luckett. Early in his career, he held a research fellowship at St Catharine's and then a joint college lectureship at Trinity Hall, Cambridge, and Girton College, but struggled to secure a permanent post at Cambridge – he later said he felt "essentially exiled" after being passed over five times. In 1990, aged only 32, he was appointed to the position of King Alfred Professor of English Literature at Liverpool University, a post held by a succession of distinguished Shakespeare scholars including A. C. Bradley, Kenneth Muir, and Philip Edwards – a move he described as "the best decision of my life". He taught at Liverpool from 1991 to 2003, then became Professor of Shakespeare and Renaissance Literature at Warwick, where he led a collaboration with the Royal Shakespeare Company and won major funding to launch the CAPITAL Centre ("Creativity and Performance in Teaching and Learning"), bringing rehearsal room techniques to the classroom.

In 2011, Bate was elected Provost of Worcester College, Oxford. During his tenure at Worcester, he led a major fundraising campaign and oversaw construction of the college's Sultan Nazrin Shah Centre, which was shortlisted for the Stirling Prize for architecture. Bate has held visiting posts at Yale University, the University of California, Los Angeles, and the Huntington Library and Folger Shakespeare Library, and served on the board of the Royal Shakespeare Company and the Council of the Arts and Humanities Research Council.

In addition to academia, Bate has been active in theatre. In 2010, he wrote The Man from Stratford, a one-man play about Shakespeare commissioned for Simon Callow, which premiered at the Edinburgh Festival Fringe and toured the UK. The show was later renamed Being Shakespeare and enjoyed three runs in London’s West End (2011–2012 and 2014), as well as transfers to New York (at the Brooklyn Academy of Music), Chicago, and Trieste. Being Shakespeare, described by one critic as a “revelatory theatrical masterpiece,” was praised for its engaging portrayal of the Bard's life. Bate's script mingles biographical episodes with extracts from Shakespeare's works and historical context, while having the actor narrate Shakespeare's story rather than impersonate him. Callow's performance earned positive reviews, and the production toured internationally. Bate has also written for the stage in other ways; for example, he served as textual consultant for the Royal Shakespeare Company and was co-curator of the British Museum's 2012 exhibition Shakespeare: Staging the World, for which he co-wrote the catalogue.

== Writer ==
Literary scholarship and books

Bate’s early books include Shakespeare and the English Romantic Imagination (1986) and Shakespearean Constitutions (1989), but he first gained wide acclaim with Romantic Ecology: Wordsworth and the Environmental Tradition (1991). That work helped introduce the concept of literary ecocriticism to Britain, marking Bate as a pioneer in environmental literary studies. He has since been credited with “[making] Shakespeare and ecology speak to each other” in his criticism.

In 1997 Bate published The Genius of Shakespeare, a wide-ranging assessment of Shakespeare’s originality and influence; the director Sir Peter Hall praised it as “the best modern book on Shakespeare.” The Genius of Shakespeare has since been reissued as a classic in its field. Bate’s other works of the 1990s include Shakespeare and Ovid (1993) and a novel, The Cure for Love (1998), inspired by the life of William Hazlitt.

Literary biography

Bate is also known for literary biography. His John Clare: A Biography (2003) was widely acclaimed for its thoroughness and insight into the 19th-century poet John Clare’s life and mental struggles. The book won the Hawthornden Prize and the James Tait Black Memorial Prize for biography, and was shortlisted for the Samuel Johnson Prize. The Guardian lauded Bate’s Clare biography as “appropriately ample and properly judicious,” combining passionate advocacy with a calm refusal to mythologize Clare’s madness. The Independent’s reviewer Roy Hattersley wrote that the book “is a joy to read and a necessary part of a civilised education,” offering an adventurous story of “the victory of art over adversity.” Bate’s biography Soul of the Age: The Life, Mind and World of William Shakespeare (2008) took an unconventional approach by structuring Shakespeare’s life around the “Seven Ages of Man” from As You Like It. Critics noted that despite the myriad of existing Shakespeare biographies, Soul of the Age succeeded in offering a fresh perspective – The Guardian found it “surprising, fresh and anything but” a mere rehash of old material. The book was a finalist for the PEN/Jacqueline Weld Award in biography. In 2019 Bate published How the Classics Made Shakespeare, examining the influence of Greek and Roman literature on Shakespeare; and in 2020 Radical Wordsworth: The Poet Who Changed the World, a biography of William Wordsworth released for the poet’s 250th birthday. Radical Wordsworth won the 2020 Lakeland Book of the Year Award for literature, and was praised for its passionate scholarship – The New Statesman said the book “enchanted” even non-specialist readers with its insightful treatment of Wordsworth’s legacy. In 2021, Bate published Bright Star, Green Light: The Beautiful Works and Damned Lives of John Keats and F. Scott Fitzgerald, an unusual dual-biography comparing the Romantic poet and the Jazz Age novelist. Reviews of this ambitious project were mixed: The Guardian admired Bate’s literary analysis (noting his “infectious” passion for Keats’s poetry) but found the parallel-lives conceit strained at times, calling the attempt “a little on the mad side” in its daring scope.

Ted Hughes biography (2015)

Bate’s Ted Hughes: The Unauthorised Life (2015) garnered widespread attention for its subject and the controversies surrounding its publication. Bate had begun the Hughes project in 2010 with the approval of the poet’s estate, but in 2014 Hughes’s widow Carol withdrew cooperation, objecting that Bate was straying beyond a narrow “literary life.” As a result, Bate’s contract with Faber & Faber was canceled and he completed the book without access to certain archives, publishing it as an “unauthorised” biography with HarperCollins. Upon release, Ted Hughes: The Unauthorised Life was shortlisted for the Samuel Johnson Prize (now the Baillie Gifford Prize) and was named Biographers International Organization’s Outstanding Arts and Literature Biography of the year. Critics generally received the book positively. The Guardian’s John Mullan praised it as a “scrupulous and lucid” account of Hughes’s life, rich with scholarly research. The Independent noted that Bate provides “the fullest account yet” of the tumultuous period around Sylvia Plath’s suicide and portrays Hughes in a “noble, tragic” light, though it observed that some aspects of Hughes’s later life (such as his conservative politics and environmental activities) receive relatively brief analysis. However, the Hughes estate publicly condemned the biography. Carol Hughes accused Bate of containing “significant errors” and “offensive” speculation, citing 18 purported mistakes in just one section of the book. HarperCollins defended the work as “impeccably researched” and noted that Bate had the cooperation of Hughes’s sister and daughter, even if the widow disapproved. Bate himself stated that as a biographer his aim was to tell Hughes’s story “as truthfully and fully as possible, and not to pass judgement.” Despite the disputes, the biography is regarded as a substantial contribution to Hughes studies, balancing literary analysis with the turbulent personal narrative.

Style and critical reception

Bate’s ability to bridge academic scholarship and popular readability has made him a prominent public intellectual, but it has also drawn some criticism from fellow scholars. In the early 1990s the Romanticist John Barrell faulted Bate’s critical approach as “untroubled by the ambiguities and indeterminacies”inherent in poetry. Decades later, the Shakespearean scholar Rhodri Lewis similarly argued that Bate tends to “shut his eyes to the nuances”of literary works that deliberately embrace complexity. Michael Dobson, director of the Shakespeare Institute, once jokingly compared Bate to “a particularly efficient undergraduate” or “a teacher’s pet,” suggesting an over-eager clarity in his interpretations. Bate acknowledges that he strives to be “a writer who is also a scholar, rather than a scholar who tries to write things,” aiming to make literary analysis accessible to a broad audience. Indeed, many reviewers have complimented the lucidity and narrative energy of his books, even as academic purists occasionally question his approach. Overall, Bate is credited with reinvigorating interest in his subjects—his Clare and Hughes biographies, for example, have been cited as reviving public and critical appreciation of those poets’ work—while also contributing original scholarship in fields as diverse as Shakespearean source study and environmental humanities.

== Textual editing ==
Bate is widely recognised for his work as a scholarly editor of Shakespeare and Romantic literature. He has edited several canonical texts, combining close textual scholarship with an accessible critical style.

His edition of Titus Andronicus for the Arden Shakespeare (first published in 1995; revised in 2018) has been credited with helping to revive the play’s critical and theatrical reputation. The edition was praised for its thorough engagement with sources and its sustained argument that the play’s gruesomeness should be understood within the aesthetics of early modern revenge tragedy. Reviewing the edition in Shakespeare Survey, Stanley Wells described it as “a landmark in modern Shakespeare editing,” noting Bate’s balanced attention to both textual and performative dimensions.

In 2007, Bate and Eric Rasmussen served as general editors of The RSC Shakespeare: Complete Works, a major edition of the plays published by the Royal Shakespeare Company and Macmillan/Random House. It was the first collected edition since Nicholas Rowe’s in 1709 to use the First Folio as the copy text for all 36 canonical plays, including those previously edited from quarto sources. This decision was described by Bate as restoring “the living theatre of Shakespeare’s own time,” although it drew criticism from some textual scholars for departing from modern editorial convention. The edition won the 2007 Falstaff Award for Best Shakespearean Book of the Year.

The edition was praised by some for its readability and stage-centered approach. The Times Literary Supplement called it “a handsome and intelligent edition for actors and readers alike.” However, critics also noted omissions, most notably the removal of A Lover’s Complaint from the Shakespeare canon. Each play was also issued in a separate volume, with Bate contributing introductions and commissioning interviews with stage directors and actors.

In 2013, Bate and Rasmussen published a companion volume, Collaborative Plays by Shakespeare and Others, which included plays often considered apocryphal or co-authored. It was the first major edition to include The Spanish Tragedy with the additional scenes often attributed to Shakespeare, arguing for their stylistic compatibility with his late style. This volume also received the Falstaff Award.

A second edition of The RSC Shakespeare: Complete Works was released in 2022. It retained the First Folio base text approach but introduced new features, including marginal stage directions that reflect common performance practices, aiming to bridge the gap between scholarly and theatrical use. The updated edition also revised textual commentary in light of ongoing scholarship, particularly around authorship attribution and editorial method.

Beyond Shakespeare, Bate has edited several influential anthologies. His volume The Romantics on Shakespeare (Penguin, 1992) remains a key resource for students of reception history, bringing together 18th- and 19th-century responses to Shakespeare with a substantial critical introduction. Reviewing the book in The Review of English Studies, Isabella Wheater wrote that Bate “makes a strong case for Romantic criticism as a creative engagement with Shakespeare rather than a subordinate phase in literary historiography.”

His John Clare: Selected Poems (Faber, 2004) draws on his biography of the poet and presents Clare as a proto-ecological voice. The edition has been cited for renewing critical attention to Clare’s formal innovation and environmental vision. Bate also edited English Romantic Poetry for the Everyman’s Library series, balancing canonical figures with lesser-known poets and emphasizing nature and politics in the Romantic canon.

== Broadcasting ==
Bate frequently appears on radio and television. He is a regular contributor to BBC Radio 4, known for presenting literary documentaries and participating in discussions. Bate has been a panellist on Melvyn Bragg’s BBC Radio 4 programme In Our Time over a dozen times, often as the lead contributor on episodes about Shakespeare and the Romantic poets. He has written and presented several radio series for BBC Radio 4, notable for their blend of scholarship and accessible storytelling. His programmes include The Elizabethan Discovery of England (exploring how Tudor-era writers and cartographers viewed the English landscape), Faking the Classics (on literary forgeries and hoaxes), and The Poetry of History (comparing poetic and historical accounts of events). In 2020, Bate presented In Wordsworth’s Footsteps, a three-part Radio 4 series marking Wordsworth’s 250th birthday in which he traveled through the poet’s Lake District haunts. The series, featuring actor Simon Russell Beale reading Wordsworth’s verses, was praised as “incredibly dense and atmospheric,” almost “storyboarded like a movie” with its rich blend of location sound and narration. Reviewers noted that In Wordsworth’s Footsteps vividly evoked the landscapes of Wordsworth’s life, interweaving biography and recitation to illuminate the poetry. Bate’s engaging radio style has won admiration; The Daily Telegraph wrote that listening to his Wordsworth series “filled my heart with pleasure,” highlighting its informative yet restorative tone.

On television, Bate has contributed to cultural and historical documentaries. In 2016 he appeared in the BBC series Shakespeare Live! and in Muse of Fire, discussing Shakespeare’s continuing relevance. More prominently, Bate was featured in the PBS Great Performances documentary Making Shakespeare: The First Folio (2023), produced for the 400th anniversary of Shakespeare’s First Folio. In this film, Bate serves as an expert guide to the significance of the 1623 First Folio of Shakespeare’s plays, which he has called “the most important secular book in the history of the Western world.” In one notable segment of the documentary, Bate and former Royal Shakespeare Company director Gregory Doran meet with King Charles III (a longtime Shakespeare enthusiast) to examine a rare Second Folio that once belonged to King Charles I. In this on-camera conversation, Bate engages the King in discussing the Folio’s history and legacy, in effect interviewing him about the royal family’s connection to Shakespeare. The documentary also shows Bate guiding viewers through the Folio’s contents and its narrow escape from obscurity. Bate’s contributions to Making Shakespeare: The First Folio were highlighted in reviews; the Orlando Sentinel noted that he brought “erudition and enthusiasm” to the exploration of how the Folio preserved half of Shakespeare’s plays for posterity. Bate has also appeared in other TV programmes, such as Simon Schama Meets… (BBC, 2022), where he discussed Shakespeare’s enduring impact. His skill at communicating complex literary history in a visually engaging manner has made him a sought-after commentator on arts documentaries.

== Personal life ==
Bate is married to the author and biographer Paula Byrne, whom he met during his years at Liverpool University. The couple have three children. Byrne is known for biographies of Jane Austen and others, and the two have occasionally collaborated (co-editing an anthology of poetry for mental health, Stressed, Unstressed, in 2016). Bate and his family moved to Arizona in 2019 when he joined ASU, though he retains ties to the UK through his Oxford fellowship and cultural projects. In interviews, Bate has spoken of his passion for sustainability and the natural environment, interests which overlap with his literary focus on Romantic poetry and ecology.

== Honours ==
In the 2006 Queen’s Birthday Honours Bate was appointed Commander of the Order of the British Empire (CBE) for services to higher education. He was elected a Fellow of the British Academy (FBA) in 1999 and a Fellow of the Royal Society of Literature (FRSL) in 2004. In the 2015 New Year Honours, he was knighted for services to literary scholarship and education, becoming at that time the youngest person to receive a knighthood in that field. The knighthood citation praised Bate as a “true Renaissance man.”

He has served as Chair of the Hawthornden Foundation (formerly Hawthornden Literary Retreat and Prize Trust) since 2022, and of the Wordsworth Trust since April 2026.

In April 2025, he was awarded a Guggenheim Fellowship.

== Bibliography ==
=== Books ===
- Shakespeare and the English Romantic imagination. Oxford University Press. 1986.
- Shakespearean Constitutions: Politics, Theatre, Criticism 1730–1830. Oxford University Press. 1989. ISBN 0-19-811749-3.
- Romantic Ecology: Wordsworth and the Environmental Tradition. Routledge. 1991.
- Shakespeare and Ovid. Oxford University Press. 1993.
- Co-editor, Shakespeare: An Illustrated Stage History. Oxford University Press. 1996. ISBN 978-0-19-812372-9.
- The Genius of Shakespeare. Picador/Oxford University Press. 1997. ISBN 978-0-19-512196-4.
- The Cure for Love. Picador. 1998.
- The Song of the Earth. Picador/Harvard University Press. 2000. ISBN 9780674001688.
- John Clare: A Biography. Picador/Farrar Straus and Giroux. 2003.
- Soul of the Age: The Life, Mind and World of William Shakespeare. Viking. 2008. ISBN 978-0-670-91482-1.
- English Literature: A Very Short Introduction. Oxford University Press. 2010. ISBN 978-0-19-956926-7.
- Editor, The Public Value of the Humanities. Bloomsbury. 2011.
- Shakespeare: Staging the World. British Museum London/Oxford University Press New York. 2012. ISBN 978-0-7141-2824-5. (British Museum exhibition, co-authored with Dora Thornton)
- Co-editor, Worcester: Portrait of an Oxford College. Third Millennium. 2014.
- Ted Hughes: The Unauthorised Life. William Collins London/HarperCollins New York/Fourth Estate Sydney. 2015.
- The Shepherd's Hut: Poems. Unbound. 2017. 978-1-7835-2430-3
- How the Classics made Shakespeare. Princeton University Press. 2019. ISBN 978-0-19-956926-7.
- Radical Wordsworth: The Poet Who Changed the World. Yale University Press. 2020. ISBN 978-0-3001-6964-5.
- Bright Star, Green Light: The Beautiful Works & Damned Lives of John Keats & F. Scott Fitzgerald. William Collins UK; Yale University Press USA. 2021. ISBN 978-0-300-25657-4
- The Poetry of History. BBC Studios. Audiobook. 2021.
- Mad About Shakespeare: From Classroom to Theatre to Emergency Room. William Collins. 2022. ISBN 978-0-00-816746-2.

=== Editions ===
- Charles Lamb: Elia and The Last Essays of Elia. Oxford University Press. 1987.
- The Romantics on Shakespeare. Penguin Books. 1992.
- The Arden Shakespeare: Titus Andronicus. Routledge. 1995. (Revised version, 2018)
- John Clare: Selected Poems. Faber and Faber. 2004.
- The RSC Shakespeare: Complete Works. Macmillan/Random House Modern Library. 2007.
- The RSC Shakespeare: Individual Works, 34 vols. Macmillan/Random House Modern Library. 2008.
- The RSC Shakespeare: Collaborative Plays by Shakespeare and Others. Macmillan. 2013.
- Stressed Unstressed: Classic Poems to Ease the Mind, co-edited with Paula Byrne, Sophie Ratcliffe, Andrew Schuman. William Collins. 2016.
- The RSC Shakespeare: Complete Works Second Edition. Bloomsbury Academic. 2022.

=== Articles ===
Out of the Twilight, New Statesman, 130, no. 4546, (16 July 2001), pp. 25–27.

‘Othello and the Other: Turning Turk: The Subtleties of Shakespeare's Treatment of Islam’, TLS: The Times Literary Supplement, 19 October 2001, pp. 14–15.

Hazlitt, William (1778-1830), Oxford Dictionary of National Biography (Oxford University Press, 2004),

‘Was Shakespeare an Essex Man?’, Proceedings of the British Academy, 162 (2009), pp. 1–28. The 2008 British Academy Shakespeare Lecture.

‘Shakespeare in the Twilight of Romanticism: Wagner, Swinburne, Pater’, Shakespeare Jahrbuch, 146 (2010), pp. 11–25. The 2009 Shakespeares-Tag Lecture, Weimar.

‘Much throwing about of brains’, Brain: A Journal of Neurology, 132.9 (September 2009), pp. 2617–2620, https://doi.org/10.1093/brain/awp205

‘Books do Furnish a Mind: the Art and Science of Bibliotherapy’, with Andrew Schuman, The Lancet, 20 Feb 2016, https://doi.org/10.1016/S0140-6736(16)00337-8

‘“The infirmity of his age”: Shakespeare’s 400th Anniversary’, The Lancet, 23 April 2016, https://doi.org/10.1016/S0140-6736(16)30269-0

‘The Anatomy of Melancholy Revisited’, The Lancet, 6 May 2017, https://doi.org/10.1016/S0140-6736(17)31152-2

‘The worst is not, so long as we can say “This is the worst”’, The Lancet, 14 April 2020, https://doi.org./10.1016/S0140-6736(20)30811-4

‘Cherchez la femme: Keats and Mrs Jones’, TLS: The Times Literary Supplement, 19 February 2021, https://www.the-tls.co.uk/issues/february-19-2021/

‘John Keats in the season of mists’, The Lancet, 22 February 2021, https://doi.org/10.1016/S0140-6736(21)00449-9

Academic offices
Preceded by Richard Smethurst	Provost of Worcester College, Oxford; 2011–2019	Succeeded by Kate Tunstall (interim)
