= Ritchie Robertson =

British Germanist

Ritchie Neil Ninian Robertson FBA (born 1952) is a British academic who was the Taylor Professor of German Language and Literature between 2010 and 2021. He was educated at Nairn Academy in the North of Scotland and at Edinburgh University, where he took two degrees, in English and German. He has been a Fellow of Queen's College, Oxford since 2010. He is a former Germanic Editor of The Modern Language Review. Professor Robertson co-directs the Oxford Kafka Research Centre with Carolin Duttlinger and Professor Katrin Kohl. He also translates German literature into English, most recently Thomas Mann's Death in Venice and Doctor Faustus.

== Bibliography ==
- Kafka: Judaism, Politics, and Literature (Clarendon Press, 1985)
- Heine (Peter Halban, 1988; Grove Press, 1988)
- A History of Austrian Literature 1918-2000 (Rochester, NY: Camden House, 2006), editor, with Katrin Kohl
- The "Jewish Question" in German Literature, 1749-1939 (Oxford: OUP, 1999)
- The German-Jewish Dialogue: An Anthology of Literary Texts, 1749-1993 (Oxford World's Classics, 1999) ISBN 0-19-283910-1, editor and translator
- The Cambridge Companion to Thomas Mann (Cambridge University Press, 2002). ISBN 0-521-65370-3, editor
- Kafka: A Very Short Introduction (Oxford: Oxford University Press, 2004); illustrated edition titled Kafka: A Brief Insight (New York: Sterling Publishing Co., Inc., 2010)
- Mock-Epic Poetry from Pope to Heine (Oxford: Oxford University Press, 2009)
- The Enlightenment: The Pursuit of Happiness, 1680-1790 (New York: Harper, 2021)
