= La bestia humana =

- Release date: 1957
- Running time: 107 minute
- Country: Argentina
- Language: Spanish

La bestia humana is a 1957 Argentine drama film directed by Daniel Tinayre. The story is based on the 1890 novel La Bête Humaine by the French writer Émile Zola.
