= Judith Still =

Judith Still FBA
- Born: 1958 (age 67–68)

Academic background
- Education: University College London (PhD)
- Thesis: The code of beneficence in the works of Jean-Jacques Rousseau : a study of the precariousness of justice in relations between non-equals : with special reference to pudicity (1985)
- Influences: Jacques Derrida; Hélène Cixous; Luce Irigaray

Judith Mary Still FBA (born 1958) is Emeritus Professor of French and Critical Theory at the University of Nottingham.

She earned her PhD from University College London in 1985 with a thesis titled The code of beneficence in the works of Jean-Jacques Rousseau : a study of the precariousness of justice in relations between non-equals : with special reference to pudicity.

Her research focuses on the 18th and 20th centuries, and "is informed by feminist and poststructuralist theory (in particular the work of Jacques Derrida, Hélène Cixous and Luce Irigaray)".

In 2018, she was elected a Fellow of the British Academy. Reflecting on her election, she expressed her hope to contribute to the Academy's diversity, as a woman and a critical theorist but also "in that I was first in my family to go to University, supported by a loving single mother and a State that gave me a full and unconditional grant throughout my studies".

She is also a former president of the Society for French Studies.

== Selected publications ==
- Derrida and hospitality: theory and practice (2013, Edinburgh UP: ISBN 9780748669639)
- Derrida and other animals: the boundaries of the human (2015, Edinburgh UP: ISBN 9780748680979)
- Enlightenment hospitality: cannibals, harems and adoption (2011, Voltaire Foundation: ISBN 9780729410106)
- Feminine economies: thinking against the market in the enlightenment and the late twentieth century (1997, Manchester UP: ISBN 9780719045554)
- Justice and difference in the works of Rousseau: bienfaisance and pudeur (1993, Cambridge UP: ISBN 0521415853)
