= Doctor Faustus (novel) =

1947 novel by Thomas Mann

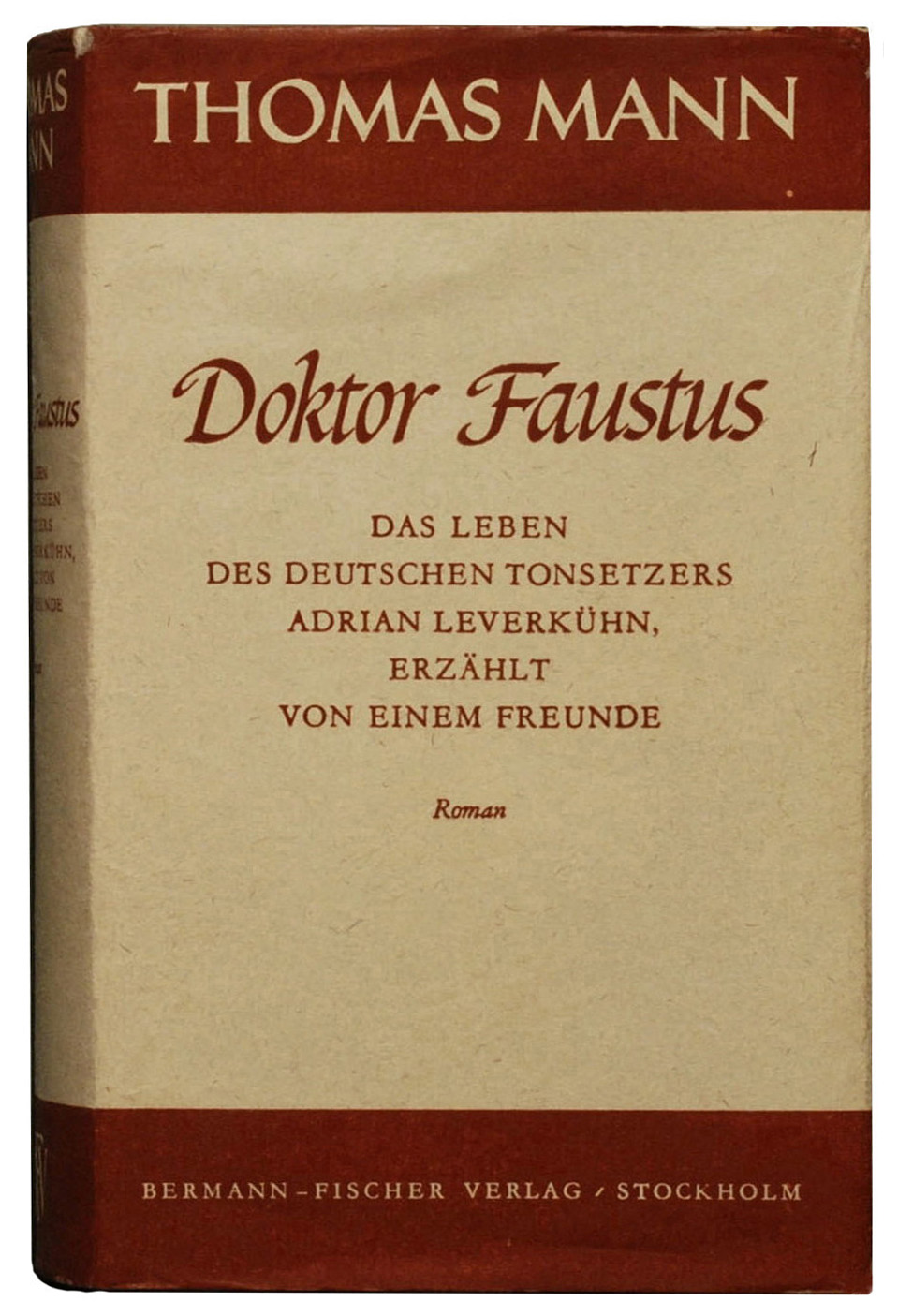
- First edition cover (jacket) in Europe
- Author: Thomas Mann
- Language: German
- Genre: Philosophical novel
- Publication date: 1947
- Publication place: Germany
- Media type: Print

Doctor Faustus is a German novel written by Thomas Mann, begun in 1943 and published in 1947 as Doktor Faustus: Das Leben des deutschen Tonsetzers Adrian Leverkühn, erzählt von einem Freunde ("Doctor Faustus: The Life of the German Composer Adrian Leverkühn, Told by a Friend"). It has been translated into English three times, most recently in 2026.

== Outline ==
The novel is a re-shaping of the Faust legend set in the context of the first half of the 20th century and the turmoil of Germany in that period. The story centers on the life and work of the (fictitious) composer Adrian Leverkühn. The narrator is Leverkühn's childhood friend Serenus Zeitblom, who writes in Germany between 1943 and 1946.

Leverkühn's extraordinary intellect and creativity as a young man mark him as destined for success, but his ambition is for true greatness. He strikes a Faustian bargain for creative genius: he intentionally contracts syphilis, which deepens his artistic inspiration through madness. He is subsequently visited by a Mephistophelean being (who says, in effect, "that you can only see me because you are mad, does not mean that I do not really exist"), and, renouncing love, bargains his soul in exchange for twenty-four years of genius. His madness – his daemonic inspiration – leads to extraordinary musical creativity (which parallels the actual innovations of Arnold Schoenberg).

Leverkühn's last creative years are increasingly haunted by his obsession with the Apocalypse and the Last Judgment. He feels the inexorable progress of his neuro-syphilitic madness leading towards complete breakdown. As in certain of the Faust legends, he calls together his closest friends to witness his final collapse. At a chamber-reading of his cantata "The Lamentation of Doctor Faust", he ravingly confesses his demonic pact before becoming incoherent. His madness reduces him to an infantile state in which he lives under the care of his relatives for another ten years.

Leverkühn's life unfolds in the context of, and in parallel with, the German cultural and political environment which led to the rise and downfall of Nazi Germany. But the predisposing conditions for Leverkühn's pact with the devil are set in character in the artistic life and processes themselves, not merely as political allegory. The interplay of layers between the narrator's historical situation, the progress of Leverkühn's madness, and the medieval legends with which he consciously connects himself make for an overwhelmingly rich symbolic network, an ambiguous complexity that cannot be reduced to a single interpretation.

== Plot ==
The origins of the narrator and the protagonist in the fictitious small town of Kaisersaschern on the Saale, the name of Zeitblom's apothecary father, Wohlgemut, and the description of Adrian Leverkühn as an old-fashioned German type, with a cast of features "from a time before the Thirty Years' War", evoke the old post-medieval Germany. In their respective Catholic and Lutheran origins, and theological studies, they are heirs to the German Renaissance and the world of Dürer and Bach, but sympathetic to, and admired by, the "keen-scented receptivity of Jewish circles".

They are awakened to musical knowledge by Wendell Kretzschmar, a German American organist, lecturer, and musicologist in Kaisersaschern. After schooling together, both boys study at Halle – Adrian studies theology; Zeitblom does not, but participates in discussions with the theological students – but Adrian becomes absorbed in musical harmony, counterpoint and polyphony as a key to metaphysics and mystic numbers, and follows Kretzschmar to Leipzig to study with him.

Zeitblom describes "with a religious shudder" Adrian's embrace with the woman who gave him syphilis (whom Adrian names "Esmeralda" after the butterfly that fascinates his father), how he worked her name in note-ciphers into his compositions, and how the medics who sought to heal him were all prevented from effecting a cure by mysterious and deadly interventions. Zeitblom begins to perceive the demonic, as Adrian develops other friendships, first with the translator Rüdiger Schildknapp, and then after his move to Munich with the handsome young violinist Rudi Schwerdtfeger, Frau Rodde and her doomed daughters Clarissa and Ines, a numismatist named Dr. Kranich, and two artists named Leo Zink and Baptist Spengler.

Zeitblom insists, however, on the unique closeness of his own relationship to Adrian, for he remains the only person whom the composer addresses by the familiar pronoun. Adrian meets the Schweigestill family at Pfeiffering in the country an hour from Munich, which later becomes his permanent home and retreat. While a fictional town, Mann based Pfeiffering on the actual Bavarian town of Polling.

He lives at Palestrina in Italy with Schildknapp in 1912, and Zeitblom visits them. It is there that Adrian, working on music for an operatic adaptation of Shakespeare's Love's Labour's Lost, has his long dialogue with a Mephistopheles figure who appears either objectively or out of his own afflicted soul. In these central pages, the fulcrum of the story, Zeitblom presents Adrian's manuscript of the conversation. The demon, speaking in archaic German, claims Esmeralda as the instrument by which he entraps Adrian and offers him twenty-four years' life as a genius – the supposed incubation period of his syphilis – if he will now renounce the warmth of love. The dialogue reveals the anatomy of Leverkühn's thought.

Adrian then moves permanently to Pfeiffering, and in conversations with Zeitblom confesses a darker view of life. Figures of a demonic type appear, such as Dr. Chaim Breisacher, to cast down the idols of the older generation.

In 1915, Ines Rodde marries, but forms an adulterous love for Rudi Schwerdtfeger. Adrian begins to experience illnesses of retching, headaches and migraines, but is producing new and finer music, preparing the way for his great work, the oratorio Apocalypsis cum Figuris ('The Apocalypse with Figures'). Schwerdtfeger woos himself into Adrian's solitude, asking for a violin concerto that would be like the offspring of their platonic union.

By August 1919 Adrian has completed the sketch of Apocalypsis. There is also a new circle of intellectual friends, including Sextus Kridwiss, the art-expert; Chaim Breisacher; Dr. Egon Unruhe, the palaeozoologist; Georg Vogler, a literary historian; Dr. Holzschuher, a Dürer scholar; and the saturnine poet Daniel zur Höhe. In their discussions they declare the need for the renunciation of bourgeois softness and a preparation for an age of pre-medieval harshness. Adrian writes to Zeitblom that collectivism is the true antithesis of Bourgeois culture; Zeitblom observes that aestheticism is the herald of barbarism.

Apocalypsis is performed in Frankfurt in 1926 under Otto Klemperer with 'Erbe' as the St. John narrator. Zeitblom describes the work as filled with longing without hope, with hellish laughter transposed and transfigured even into the searing tones of spheres and angels.

Adrian, producing the concerto which Rudi solicited, attempts to evade his contract and obtain a wife by employing Rudi as the messenger of his love. She however prefers Rudi himself, and not Adrian. Soon afterwards Rudi is shot dead in a tram by Ines out of jealousy. As Adrian begins to plan the second oratorio The Lamentation of Doctor Faustus, in 1928, his sister's child Nepomuk is sent to live with him. The boy, who calls himself "Echo", is beloved by all.

As the work of gigantic dimensions develops in Adrian's mind, the child falls ill and dies, and Adrian, despairing, believes that by gazing at him with love, in violation of his contract, he has killed him with poisonous and hellish influences.

The score of the Lamentation is completed in 1930, Adrian summons his friends and guests, and instead of playing the music he relates the story of his infernal contract, and descends into the brain disease which lasts until his death ten years later.

Zeitblom visits him occasionally, and survives to witness the collapse of Germany's "dissolute triumphs" as he tells the story of his friend.

== Sources and origins ==
Mann published his own account of the genesis of the novel in 1949. The novel's title and themes are inseparable in German literature from its highest dramatic expression in the Faust I and Faust II of the poet Goethe, and declares Mann's intention to address his subject in the light of that profound, authentic exploration and depiction of the German character. Yet the relationship is indirect, the Faustian aspect of Leverkühn's character being paralleled in the abnormal circumstances surrounding Nazism. Helen Lowe-Porter, the novel's first English translator, wrote of its themes,

Readers of Faustus will and must be involved, with shudders, in all three strands of the book: the German scene from within, and its broader, its universal origins; the depiction of an art not German alone but vital to our whole civilization; music as one instance of the arts and the state in which the arts find themselves today [sc. 1949]; and, finally, the invocation of the daemonic.

=== Nietzsche ===
The trajectory of Leverkühn's career is modeled partly upon the life of Friedrich Nietzsche (1844–1900). From his supposed contraction of syphilis to his complete mental collapse in 1889 and his death in 1900, Nietzsche's life presents a celebrated example imitated in Leverkühn. (The illnesses of Delius and Wolf also resonate, as does the death of Mahler's child after he had tempted fate (as Alma Mahler thought) by setting the Kindertotenlieder). Nietzsche's 1871 work The Birth of Tragedy from the Spirit of Music, presents the theme that the evolution of Art is bound up with the duality of the Apollonian and Dionysian Hellenic impulses, which the novel illuminates. Perhaps the 'serene' Zeitblom and the tragical Leverkuhn personify such a duality between impulses towards reasoned, contemplative progress, and those toward passion and tragic destiny, within character or creativity in the context of German society. Mann wrote, "Zeitblom is a parody of myself. Adrian's mood is closer to my own than one might – and ought to – think."

=== Guidance ===
Theodor Adorno acted as Mann's adviser and encouraged him to rewrite large sections of the book. Mann also read chapters to groups of invited friends (a method also used by Kafka) to test the effect of the text. In preparation for the work, Mann studied musicology and biographies of major composers including Mozart, Beethoven, Hector Berlioz, Hugo Wolf, Franz Schreker and Alban Berg. He communicated with living composers, including Igor Stravinsky, Arnold Schoenberg and Hanns Eisler. In Chapter XXII Leverkühn develops the twelve-tone technique or row system, which was actually invented by Arnold Schoenberg. Schoenberg lived near Mann in Los Angeles as the novel was being written. He was very annoyed by this appropriation without his consent, and later editions of the novel included an Author's Note at the end acknowledging that the technique was Schoenberg's invention, and that passages of the book dealing with musical theory are indebted in many details to Schoenberg's Harmonielehre.

=== Models for the composer-legend ===
Leverkühn's projected work The Lamentation of Dr Faustus echoes the name of Ernst Krenek's Lamentatio Jeremiae prophetae, an oratorio of 1941–1942 which combines the Schoenbergian twelve-tone technique with modal counterpoint. As a model for the composer-legend Mann was strongly aware of Hans Pfitzner's opera Palestrina, premiered at Munich in 1917. Leverkühn's preoccupation with polyphonic theory draws on the opera's theme of how the composer Palestrina sought to preserve polyphonic composition in his Missa Papae Marcelli. The tenor Karl Erb (also very famous as Evangelist narrator in Bach's St. Matthew Passion) created the role in Pfitzner's opera, and the singer-narrator in Leverkühn's Apocalysis cum Figuris is named 'Erbe' (meaning 'heritage', i.e. inheritor of the tradition) in reference to him.

Two other German operas of the time, the Berlin-based Ferruccio Busoni's Doktor Faust (left unfinished in 1924), and Paul Hindemith's Mathis der Maler (about Matthias Grünewald), completed 1935, similarly explore the isolation of the creative individual, presenting the ethical, spiritual and artistic crises of the early 20th century through their roots in the German Protestant Reformation.

=== Naming ===
Throughout the work personal names are used allusively to reflect the paths of German culture from its medieval roots. For examples, Zeitblom's father Wohlgemut has the resonance of the artist Michael Wohlgemuth, teacher of Albrecht Dürer. Wendell Kretzschmar, the man who awakens them to music, probably hints at Hermann Kretzschmar, musical analyst, whose 'Guides to the Concert Hall' were widely read. The doomed child's name Nepomuk, in the 19th century quite popular in Austria and southern Germany, recalls the composer Johann Nepomuk Hummel and the playwright Johann Nestroy. Reflecting the (Counter-Reformation) cult of John Nepomuk, it therefore also evokes the high rococo, the 're-echoing of movement', in the St John Nepomuk Church architecture by the Asam brothers in Munich, and probably the descriptions and interpretations of it by Heinrich Wölfflin. In chapter XXXIX, Herr and Frau Reiff are modeled on the Swiss music patrons Hermann and Lily Reiff.

The character of the violinist Rudi Schwerdtfeger is modelled on Paul Ehrenberg of Dresden, an admired friend of Mann's. But in general the characters and names echo philosophies and intellectual standpoints without intending portraits or impersonations of real individuals. They serve the many-layered, multi-valent allusiveness of Mann's style to underpin and reinforce the symbolic nature of his work.

== Themes ==
As a re-telling of the Faust myth, the novel is concerned with themes such as pride, temptation, the cost of greatness, loss of humanity and so on. Another concern is with the intellectual fall of Germany in the time leading up to World War II. Leverkühn's own moods and ideology mimic the change from humanism to irrational nihilism found in Germany's intellectual life in the 1930s. Leverkühn becomes increasingly corrupt of body and of mind, ridden by syphilis and insanity. In the novel, all of these thematic threads – Germany's intellectual fall, Leverkühn's spiritual fall, and the physical corruption of his body – directly correspond to the national disaster of fascist Germany. In Mann's published version of his 1938 United States lecture tour, The Coming Victory of Democracy, he said, "I must regretfully own that in my younger years I shared that dangerous German habit of thought which regards life and intellect, art and politics as totally separate worlds." He now realised that they were inseparable. In Doktor Faustus, Leverkühn's personal history, his artistic development, and the shifting German political climate are tied together by the narrator Zeitblom as he feels out and worries over the moral health of his nation (just as he had worried over the spiritual health of his friend, Leverkühn).

== Adaptations ==
- Franz Seitz's 1982 adaptation of the novel for West German television starred Jon Finch as Adrian Leverkühn.
- Alexander Sokurov's film Faust (2011) is loosely based on both Mann's novel and Goethe's play.

== English translations ==
- Helen T. Lowe-Porter (Alfred A. Knopf, 1948). The translator in her note remarked, 'Grievous difficulties do indeed confront anyone essaying the role of copyist to this vast canvas, this cathedral of a book, this woven tapestry of symbolism.' She described her translation as 'a version which cannot lay claim to being beautiful, though in every intent it is deeply faithful.' She employed medieval English vocabulary and phrasing to correspond with those sections of the text in which characters speak in Early New High German.
- John E. Woods (Alfred A. Knopf, 1997; Vintage, 1999).
- Ritchie Robertson (Oxford University Press, 2026).

== See also ==
- Best German Novels of the 20th century

== Sources ==
- Beddow, Michael. Thomas Mann: Doctor Faustus (Cambridge University Press 1994).
- Bergsten, Gunilla. Thomas Mann's Doctor Faustus: The Sources and Structure of the Novel translated by Krishna Winston (University of Chicago Press 1969).
- Carnegy, Patrick. Faust as Musician: A Study of Thomas Mann's Novel Doctor Faustus (New Directions 1973).
- Giordano, Diego. Thomas Mann's Doctor Faustus and the twelve-tone technique. From the Myth to the Alienation, in Calixtilia (n.3), Lampi di Stampa, 2010. ISBN 978-88-488-1150-7.
- Mann, Thomas. Doktor Faustus. Das Leben des deutschen Tonsetzers Adrian Leverkühn erzählt von einem Freunde (S. Fischer Verlag, Frankfurt am Main 1947).
- Mann, Thomas; translation by Helen Tracy Lowe-Porter Doctor Faustus: The Life of the German Composer Adrian Leverkühn, as Told by a Friend. Alfred A. Knopf, 1948. ISBN 0-679-60042-6.
- Mann, Thomas; translation by Winston, Richard and Clara. The Story of a Novel: The Genesis of Doctor Faustus (New York: Alfred A. Knopf, New York, 1961); also published as The Genesis of a Novel (London: Secker & Warburg, 1961).
- Mann, Thomas; translation by Woods, John E. Doctor Faustus: The Life of the German Composer Adrian Leverkühn, as Told by a Friend. Alfred A. Knopf, 1997. ISBN 0-375-40054-0.
- Mann, Thomas; translation by Ritchie Robertson. Doctor Faustus: The Life of the German Composer Adrian Leverkühn, as Told by a Friend. Oxford University Press, 2026. ISBN 9780198867722.
- Montiel, Luis (2003). "Más acá del bien en el mal. Topografía de la moral en Nietzsche, Mann y Tournier" (PDF). Archived from the original (PDF) on 2017-03-29.
- Reed, T. J. Thomas Mann: The Uses of Tradition. Oxford University Press, 1974. ISBN 0-19-815742-8 (cased). ISBN 0-19-815747-9 (paperback).
