= Bill Burgwinkle =

British academic

- Education: Stanford University
- Occupation: Academic
- Employer: King's College, Cambridge

William E. Burgwinkle is a UK-based American medievalist and French scholar. He is an emeritus professor in medieval French and Occitan literature at King's College, Cambridge, an emeritus fellow at King's College, and a former president of the Society for French Studies.

== Early life ==
Burgwinkle studied at the University of Massachusetts Amherst, at Boston College, and at the Ecole Normale Supérieure in Paris and completed his PhD entitled The Troubador as Subject: Biography, Erotics and Culture in 1988 at Stanford University. His early years were spent in Clinton, Massachusetts.

== Career ==
Burgwinkle previously taught at City College of San Francisco, Stanford University, and the University of Hawai'i at Manoa. He is a Professor in Medieval French and Occitan Literature at King's College, Cambridge. He served as Head of the French Department at the University of Cambridge from 2009 to 2012. His research focuses on vernacular literature, especially the Occitan troubadours, gender and queer theory, hagiography, and the history and travels of medieval manuscripts.

Burgwinkle was awarded a Pilkington Prize for excellence in teaching in 2006. In 2011, he became a knight of the Ordre des Palmes Académiques for his contributions to the dissemination of French culture through education.

== Publications ==
- Sodomy, Masculinity and Law in Medieval Literature, 1050-1230 (Cambridge University Press, 2004)
- Love for sale: Materialist Readings of the Troubadour Razo Corpus (Garland, 1997)
- Razos and Troubadour Songs (Garland, 1990).
- (as co-editor with Glenn Man and Valerie Wayne) Significant Others: Gender and Culture in Film and Literature, East and West (Hawaii, 1992).
- "The Cambridge History of French Literature", co-edited with Nick Hammond and Emma Wilson (Cambridge University Press, 2011)
- "Sanctity and Pornography in Medieval culture: on the verge", co-author with Cary Howie (Manchester UP, 2010)
- Medieval French Literary Culture Abroad. co-author with Simon Gaunt and Jane Gilbert (Oxford University Press, 2020)
