= Paula Byrne =

British author and biographer

Paula Jayne Byrne FRSA
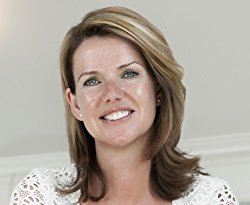
- Born: 2 August 1967 (age 59); Birkenhead, England
- Occupations: Academic; novelist; historian; biographer
- Known for: Biography, Jane Austen, literary history
- Spouse: Sir Andrew Jonathan Bate

Academic background
- Education: University of Chichester; University of Liverpool

Academic work
- Institutions: University of Liverpool; University of Warwick; Harris Manchester College, Oxford
- Main interests: Eighteenth century, feminism, biographies

Paula Jayne Byrne, Lady Bate (born 2 August 1967), is a British biographer, novelist, and literary critic.

== Life ==
Byrne has a PhD degree in English literature from the University of Liverpool, where she also studied for her MA degree, having completed a BA degree in English and Theology at West Sussex Institute of Higher Education (now the University of Chichester).

Byrne is the founder and chief executive of a small charitable foundation, ReLit: The Bibliotherapy Foundation, dedicated to the promotion of literature as a complementary therapy in the toolkit of medical practitioners dealing with stress, anxiety and other mental health conditions. She is also a practising psychotherapist, specialising in couples and family counselling.

Byrne, who is from a large working-class Roman Catholic family in Birkenhead, is married to Sir Jonathan Bate, Shakespeare scholar and former Provost of Worcester College, Oxford.

== Career ==
Paula Byrne's debut book was a study of Jane Austen, Jane Austen and the Theatre, which was published in 2002 by Hambledon and shortlisted for the Theatre Book Prize. An updated version, with a new chapter on stage and film adaptations of Austen, was announced for publication by HarperCollins in 2017, with the new title The Genius of Jane Austen: her love of theatre and why she is a hit in Hollywood.

In 2005, Byrne's biography Perdita: The Life of Mary Robinson was featured on the Richard & Judy Book Club on Channel 4, propelling it into The Sunday Times bestseller list. It was long listed for the Samuel Johnson Prize and contributed to a revival of interest in the work of Mary Robinson as actor, poet, novelist and proponent of women's rights.

Her book Mad World: Evelyn Waugh and the Secrets of Brideshead, another top ten bestseller, was published by HarperPress in the UK in August 2009 and HarperCollins New York in the USA in April 2010. An excerpt was published in The Sunday Times of 9 August under the headline "Sex scandal behind Brideshead Revisited". An illustrated extract appeared in the April 2010 issue of Vanity Fair in advance of American publication. The book's sympathetic view of Waugh's character contrasted with the popular image of him.

In a television programme broadcast on BBC2 on Boxing Day 2011, she explored the possibility that a Regency graphite on vellum drawing, labelled on the verso 'Miss Jane Austin', might be an authentic portrait of Jane Austen. The film presented forensic and art historical evidence that the work was authentic to the period, not a forgery, but the case for its being Austen was fiercely debated, both in the programme and subsequently in the Times Literary Supplement. Byrne lent the drawing to Jane Austen's House Museum in Chawton, where it was exhibited from summer 2012.

In January 2013, coinciding with the bicentenary of the first publication of Pride and Prejudice, Byrne published a new biography called The Real Jane Austen: A Life in Small Things. Featured as BBC Radio 4 Book of the Week, and again a Sunday Times top ten bestseller, it approaches the subject's life by means of an array of key objects, including her portable writing desk and the topaz cross given to her by her brother. Austen was presented as a more worldly figure than is often thought, more engaged with city life, but above all as a highly professional writer. Byrne subsequently served as the expert consultant to the television series Sanditon.

In 2014, Byrne published a biography of Dido Elizabeth Belle, which was a commission to coincide with the general release of the motion picture Belle. Since few facts are known about Dido, the book set her life in the broader context of women and slavery in the late eighteenth century. It became a New York Times top ten bestseller.

Her 2016 biography, Kick, the story of Kathleen Cavendish, Marchioness of Hartington (1920–1948), John F Kennedy's sister, and her marriage to Billy, William Cavendish, Marquess of Hartington, drew on letters and diaries from the Rose Fitzgerald Kennedy archive in the John F. Kennedy Presidential Library and Museum and the Devonshire family papers at Chatsworth House. It was an international bestseller, achieving particular success in the Kennedy's ancestral homeland of Ireland.

She subsequently published two novels, one of which was based on the life of Marlene Dietrich. In 2021, she returned to biography with the widely-acclaimed The Adventures of Miss Barbara Pym. Based on the archive of Barbara Pym in the Bodleian Library, it revealed many surprising aspects of the life of the English novelist, including a brief love affair with a Nazi SS officer prior to the Second World War.

== Bibliography ==
As author:

- Jane Austen and the Theatre (Hambledon / Continuum / Bloomsbury Academic, 2002).
- Perdita: The Life of Mary Robinson (Harper Perennial, 2004).
- Mad World: Evelyn Waugh and the Secrets of Brideshead (HarperPress, 2009).
- The Real Jane Austen: A Life in Small Things (William Collins, 2013).
- Belle: The True Story of Dido Belle (William Collins, 2014).
- Kick: The True Story of JFK's Forgotten Sister and the Heir to Chatsworth (William Collins, 2016).
- The Genius of Jane Austen: Her Love of Theatre and Why She Is a Hit in Hollywood (William Collins, 2017).
- Look to your Wife [fiction] (William Collins, 2018).
- Mirror Mirror [fiction] (William Collins, 2020).
- The Adventures of Miss Barbara Pym (William Collins, 2021).
- Hardy Women: Mother, Sisters, Wives, Muses (William Collins, 2024).

As editor:

- Jane Austen's Emma: A Sourcebook (Routledge, 2004).
- Stressed, Unstressed: Classic Poems to Ease the Mind, (Jonathan Bate, co-editor) (William Collins, 2016).
