= Comparative Critical Studies =

- Discipline: Literature
- Language: English

Publication details
- Former name(s): Comparative Criticism, New Comparison
- History: 2004–present
- Publisher: Edinburgh University Press (United Kingdom)
- Frequency: Triannual

Standard abbreviations
- ISO 4: Comp. Crit. Stud.

Indexing
- ISSN: 1744-1854 (print); 1750-0109 (web)

Links
- Journal homepage; British Comparative Literature Association homepage

Comparative Critical Studies is the journal of the British Comparative Literature Association (BCLA). It is published three times a year by Edinburgh University Press, in February, June and October. Comparative Critical Studies also incorporates Comparative Criticism (Cambridge University Press, 1979–2003) and New Comparison (BCLA, 1986–2003), which have now ceased publication.

This academic journal publishes articles on the theory and practice of the study of comparative literature, including: theory and history of comparative literary studies; comparative studies of conventions, genres, themes and periods; reception studies; comparative gender studies; transmediality; diasporas and the migration of culture from a literary perspective; and the theory and practice of literary translation and cultural transfer.

Journal issues regularly include a book review section. As the house journal of the BCLA, Comparative Critical Studies also publishes a list of the winners of the Dryden Translation Prize, as well as the winning entry, the keynote lectures of the triennial BCLA conference, and selected papers from BCLA conferences and workshops.

The journal is edited by Robert Weninger of King's College London.
