= Nineteenth-Century French Studies =

- Discipline: 19th-century French literature
- Language: English, French
- Edited by: Seth Whidden

Publication details
- History: 1972–present
- Publisher: University of Nebraska Press
- Frequency: Biannual

Standard abbreviations
- ISO 4: Ninet.-Century Fr. Stud.

Indexing
- ISSN: 0146-7891 (print); 1536-0172 (web)
- LCCN: 72627524
- OCLC no.: 875833944

Links
- Journal homepage; Online access at Project MUSE; Journal page at University of Nebraska Press

Nineteenth-Century French Studies is a biannual peer-reviewed academic journal covering the study of 19th-century French literature and related fields. It is published in English and French by the University of Nebraska Press. The journal publishes book reviews online. It is abstracted and indexed by Scopus, Arts & Humanities Citation Index, and Current Contents/Arts & Humanities. In January 2017, the journal received the 2016 Phoenix Award for Significant Editorial Achievement from the Council of Editors of Learned Journals

== Editors-in-chief ==
The editor-in-chief is Seth Whidden (The Queen's College, Oxford). Past editors have been Thomas H. Goetz (State University of New York at Fredonia, 1972–1999) and Marshall C. Olds (University of Nebraska–Lincoln, Michigan State University, 1999–2014).
