= French Studies Bulletin =

- Discipline: French literature and culture
- Language: English

Publication details
- History: 1982-present
- Publisher: Oxford University Press on behalf of the Society for French Studies
- Frequency: Quarterly

Standard abbreviations
- ISO 4: Fr. Stud. Bull.

Indexing
- ISSN: 0262-2750 (print); 1748-9180 (web)
- LCCN: sn82021398
- OCLC no.: 8224183

Links
- Journal homepage

The French Studies Bulletin: A Quarterly Supplement is a quarterly peer-reviewed academic journal published by Oxford University Press on behalf of the Society for French Studies. It covers all aspects of French or francophone literature, thought, culture, politics, or film. The journal is the sister publication of French Studies, but publishes shorter articles of up to 2,000 words. It was established in 1981.
