= Legenda (imprint) =

Oxford University imprint

Legenda (Latin, "things to be read") is an imprint founded in 1995 by the European Humanities Research Centre at Oxford University, England.

In 2004, Legenda became an imprint of the Modern Humanities Research Association, in partnership with Maney Publishing. Under the guidance of Malcolm Bowie, late Master of Christ's College, Cambridge, this new press underwent rapid growth. Recent successes include Clive Scott's Channel Crossings: French and English Poetry in Dialogue 1550-2000, which was awarded the 2004 Gapper Prize as the best contribution to French studies of its year, and Shun-liang Chao's Rethinking the Concept of the Grotesque: Crasahw, Baudelaire, Magritte, which was awarded an honourable mention for the 2013 Anna Balakian Prize by the International Comparative Literature Association.
