= Society for French Studies =

The Society for French Studies, or SFS, is the oldest learned association for French Studies in the UK and Ireland. It aims to promote teaching and research in French Studies within higher education. The current President is Professor Nicholas Harrison.

== Scholarly activities ==
The society has a quarterly journal published on its behalf called French Studies (Liverpool University Press), as well as a bulletin for shorter pieces and news called The French Studies Bulletin. The society also produces Research Monographs in French Studies with Legenda (imprint) and Modern Humanities Research Association. There is also an annual conference.

Each year, the society awards the Malcom Bowie Prize, the R. Gapper Book Prize, the R. Gapper Postgraduate Essay Prize, and the R. Gapper Undergraduate Essay Prize for the best scholarship produced by scholars at higher education institutions in the UK or Ireland. The Malcom Bowie Prize, awarded for the best article by an early-career researcher in the broader discipline of French Studies, was set up in honour of Malcom Bowie (1943–2007), President of the Society from 1994 to 1996 and General Editor of the journal French Studies from 1980 to 1987. The three R. Gapper prizes are supported by the Gapper Charitable Trust, which was founded by Richard Gapper (1943–2014), Honorary Treasurer of the Society from 1997 to 2000 and a long-standing member of its Finance Committee. Since 2024, the Society has also awarded a yearly Simon Gaunt Postgraduate Travel Grant, named after the scholar of medieval French literature and former President of the Society Simon Gaunt (1959–2021).

== Lobbying ==
The society promotes and defends languages learning and the humanities in general within the national educational agendas of the United Kingdom and Ireland, and also internationally. It pursues these aims through a variety of activities and communications, including collaboration and active lobbying within the policy sphere. It has lobbied and published statements concerning open-access publishing, A-level exam content, and the future of modern language learning in schools and universities in the UK and Ireland. Agencies with which it has engaged since 2014 include HEFCE, Ofqual, and the UK Department for Education and the Department for Business, Innovation and Skills.

== Past Presidents ==
- 1996–1998: Celia Britton
- 1999: Wendy Ayres-Bennett
- 2006–2008: Simon Gaunt
- 2015–2016: Mairéad Hanrahan
- 2016–2017: Bill Burgwinkle
- 2019–2020:Judith Still
- 2021–2022: Michael Syrotinski
- 2023–2024: Diana Holmes
- 2025–2026: Nicholas Harrison
