= William Deane Wilson =

British Army surgeon (1843–1921)

Surgeon-General Sir William Deane Wilson, KCMG (27 August 1843 – 19 October 1921) was a British army surgeon, who was the principal medical officer of the British Army in South Africa during the Second Boer War from 1899 to 1902.

== Background and family ==
Wilson was the son of Joseph Deane Wilson, Rathdowney, Queen's County. He married in 1880 Anna Wilhelmina Elizabeth Smythe, elder daughter of Rev. Henry Smythe. They had five sons. The family lived at Mount Tamar, St Budeaux, near Plymouth in Devon, and later moved to Westfield, East Sussex.

== Career ==
Wilson entered the army as a Staff Assistant Surgeon on 1 Oct 1867, and became Assistant Surgeon to the 107th Regiment of Foot (Bengal Light Infantry) in the British Army on 3 June 1868. He was promoted Surgeon on 1 March 1873. Transferred to Malta in April 1878, he was on garrison duty there until he left for the United Kingdom in April 1890, during which he was promoted Surgeon–Major on 1 October 1879.

Arriving in Egypt in 1882, he served in the Anglo-Egyptian War which led to the occupation of that country. In the following Sudan Expedition under Sir Gerald Graham in 1884 (part of the Mahdist War), he was Principal Medical Officer of the Infantry Brigade. He took part in the field operations against Osman Digna, and was present at the battles at El-Teb and Tamai, for which he was mentioned in dispatches, and promoted Surgeon–Major with relative rank of lieutenant-colonel on 20 May 1884.

He was promoted Brigade–Surgeon, ranking as lieutenant-colonel, on 28 October 1889, then Surgeon-Colonel on 18 July 1894, and Surgeon-General on 3 October 1898.

When the Second Boer War broke out in South Africa in October 1899, Wilson was appointed Principal Medical Officer to the British Army in South Africa, and he served as such until 30 Aug 1902, after the war had ended. He was present in the advance on Kimberly; operations in the Orange Free State (April and May 1900); operations in the Transvaal in June 1900, and east and west of Pretoria (July to 29 Nov 1900). For the latter part of the war, he travelled across the areas with active operations in the Transvaal, Orange River Colony, and Cape Colony from November 1900 until the war ended in May 1902. He returned home in September 1902. For his service in South Africa, he was mentioned in despatches three times (including despatches by Lord Kitchener dated 23 June 1902), received the Queen's South Africa Medal, the King's South Africa Medal, and was appointed a Knight Commander of the Order of St Michael and St George (KCMG) (dated 29 November 1900) in the April 1901 South Africa Honours list. He was knighted and invested as KCMG by King Edward VII at Buckingham Palace on 24 October 1902.

Following his return, he was attached to the War Office, where he wrote a report on the medical services during the war. He retired from the army on 1 Jan 1904.
