= Suakin Expedition =

Sudin Expedition Mahdist War 1884 1885

The Suakin Expedition was either of two British-Indian military expeditions, led by Major-General Sir Gerald Graham, to Suakin in Sudan, with the intention of destroying the power of the Sudanese military commander Osman Digna and his troops during the Mahdist War. The first expedition took place in February 1884 and the second in March 1885.

== First expedition ==
The first expedition, in February 1884, led to several notable British victories, among them the Second Battle of El Teb and the Battle of Tamai.

== Second expedition ==
Following the fall of Khartoum on 26 January 1885, Graham led a second expedition in March 1885. This expedition is sometimes referred to as the Suakin Field Force. Its purpose was to defeat Mahdist forces under Osman Digna in the region and to supervise and protect the construction of the Suakin-Berber Railway. A week after its arrival in Suakin, the expedition fought in two actions: the Battle of Hashin on 20 March, and the Battle of Tofrek on 22 March.

The British force was later joined by the New South Wales Contingent, which arrived at Suakin on 29 March. However, within two months the Gladstone government decided to abandon both the railway and its military campaign in Sudan. General Graham and his Suakin Field Force were evacuated from the port city on 17 May 1885. Nevertheless, Britain maintained an ongoing presence in Suakin between 1886 and 1888, and the then brevet Lt. Col. Herbert Kitchener acted out the role of Governor General of Eastern Sudan.
