= El Teb =

Halting-place in the Anglo-Egyptian Sudan

Coordinates: 18°36′40″N 37°41′07″E

El Teb, a halting-place in the Anglo-Egyptian Sudan near Suakin on the west coast of the Red Sea, 9 m. southwest of the port of Trinkitat on the road to Tokar.

In mid-December 1883, the British Prime Minister William Gladstone ordered an evacuation of the Anglo-Egyptian forces in Sudan following a ferocious revolt of Mahdists, led by Muhammad Ahmad, against the British protectorate Egypt.

At El Teb, on 4 February 1884, a heterogeneous force under General Valentine Baker, marching to the relief of the Egyptian garrison of Tokar, was completely routed by the Mahdists, led by Osman Digna.

The British response was to send forces under the command of Major-General Sir Gerald Graham V.C. from Egypt to Suakin. Graham's forces fought powerfully and defeated the Mahdists on 29 February 1884.

== See also ==
- Battles of El Teb
- Suakin Expedition
