= Battle of Tofrek =

1885 Mahdist War battle

- Part of the Mahdist War
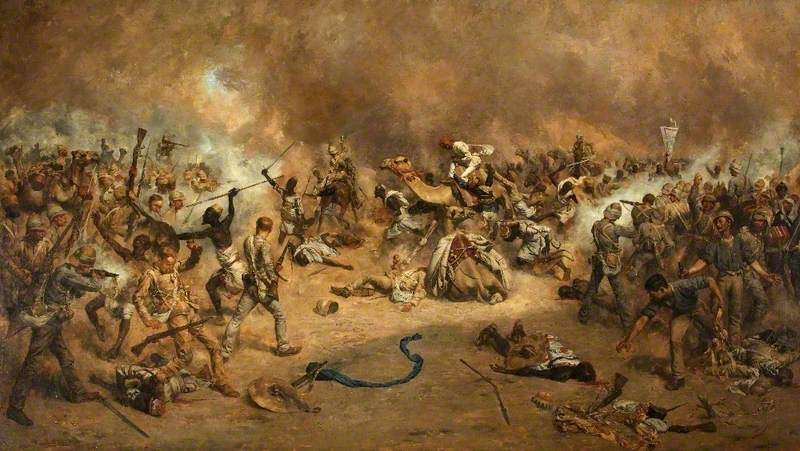
- Battle of Tofrek (Charles Edwin Fripp)
Date	22 March 1885
Location	Sudan
Result	British victory

Belligerents
United Kingdom; India	Mahdist State

Commanders and leaders
John Carstairs McNeill; Gerald Graham	Osman Digna

Strength
Between 3,000 and 4,000	Estimated over 2,000

Casualties and losses
Killed: 4 officers, 66 men; Wounded 8 officers,128 men.	Estimated over 1,000 killed

The Battle of Tofrek (Note: The Battle of Tofrek is also referred to as the Battle of McNeill's Zeriba (or M'Neill's Zeriba).) was fought on 22 March 1885 some 5 miles inland from the port of Suakin on the Red Sea coast of Sudan. A contingent of some 3,000 troops from the British and Indian "Suakin Field Force" led by Major General Sir John Carstairs McNeill (under the overall command of General Gerald Graham) was attacked by a Mahdist force under the leadership of Osman Digna. The Mahdists were heavily defeated, losing some 1,000 of their 2,000 fighters as compared to the loss of 70 British and Indian soldiers plus over 100 casualties.

== Background ==
The sacking of Khartoum and the killing of General Gordon and the massacre of thousands of civilians at the hands of Mahdist warriors in January 1885, together with the failure of the relief effort of General Wolseley's Nile Expedition, prompted the British government to revive plans to build a railway between the port of Suakin on the Red Sea and Berber on the River Nile some 300 miles north of Khartoum, to provide a supply route for Wolseley's force in further actions against Omdurman.

In order to provide protection from Osman Digna's Mahdist tribesmen who were well established in the coastal area, and to supervise the construction of this new railway, a second Suakin Field Force of some 13,000 men was assembled under General Graham who had commanded the first Suakin expedition the previous year. The force arrived in Suakin on 12 March 1885.

== Prelude ==
=== Suakin Field Force ===
Graham's Suakin Field Force consisted of a combination of British and Indian troops totalling some 13,000 men.

The British force included troops from:

- Royal Engineers commanded by Lt. Col. E.P. Leach, VC;
- The King's Shropshire Light Infantry under Lt. Col. R.H. Truell;
- The 1st Battalion Royal Berkshire Regiment under Lt. Col. Huyshe.
- The East Surrey Regiment.
- Royal Marine Light Infantry under Lt. Col. Ozzard.
- Madras Sappers and Miners.
- The 5th Royal Irish Lancers.
- The 20th Hussars.
- The Mounted infantry.
- The Royal Horse Artillery.
- The Grenadier Guards.
- The Coldstream Guards.
- The Scots Guards.

Indian contingent comprised troops from:

- 9th Bengal Cavalry.
- 17th Bengal Native Infantry.
- 15th Ludhiana Sikh Regiment.
- 28th Bombay Pioneers.

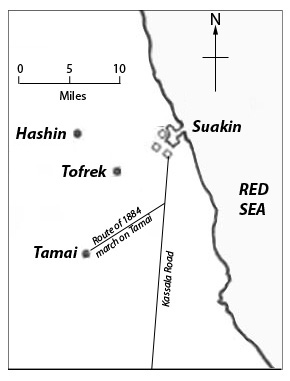
Map showing locations of Hashin and Tofrek in relation to Suakin and Tamai

=== Hashin Engagement, 20 March 1885 ===
After sending out a scouting detachment on 19 March to survey the area around Hashin some 7 miles inland, where it was believed that a number of Digna's men were camped, General Graham led an expedition comprising 8,500 fighting men and 1,500 transport animals (mules and camels) to capture Dihilbat Hill near Hashin, and to establish a zeriba (a fortified enclosure) nearby.

The expedition successfully achieved its objectives (at a cost of two officers and a handful of men) and returned to Suakin the same night.

=== Tofrek Expedition, 22 March 1885 ===
Graham's next objective was to attack Osman Digna's headquarters at Tamai, some 12 miles southwest of Suakin – a distance too great to be covered in a single day's march. It was therefore decided to establish two supply depots en route, in the form of zeribas to store the equipment, water and rations to support the main assault, Graham assigning responsibility for this task to Major General Sir John McNeill.

McNeill was instructed to leave Suakin at dawn on 22 March with a force of approximately 3000 men including:

- 1 squadron of 5th Royal Irish Lancers;
- 1 squadron of Mounted infantry;
- 1 Company of Royal Engineers,
- 1 Battalion Royal Berkshire Regiment
- 1 Battalion of Royal Marine Light Infantry;
- 3 Battalions of Indian Infantry (17th Bengal, 15th Ludhiana Sikhs & 28th Bombay Pioneers);
- 1 Company of Madras Sappers;
- Four naval Gardner (machine) guns worked by their own naval gun crews and marines .

[Note: Later in the morning a squadron of the 20th Hussars under Major Frank Graves was sent out from Suakin by General Graham to report to McNeill, presumably to render assistance, but without any specific instructions or information.]

Tools, materials, water, provisions, Gardner guns and ammunition were to be carried by some 1,500 transport animals (camels, mules etc.).

Part of the force was to march out the full 8 miles to construct the larger No. 2 zeriba, while the rest stopped at the 5 mile point to construct the No. 1 zeriba. Small garrisons were to remain in both zeribas while the bulk of the force was to return to camp the same evening.

However, on the morning of 22 March, General Graham personally made a last-minute change to the plan. Instead of taking the Kassala Road, a well established track leading southward out of Suakin and thence diverting southwest along a route that Graham had taken the year before (1884) when he fought against Osman Digna at the Battle of Tamai, he instructed McNeill to head southwestwards out of Suakin into virgin country.

McNeill and his troops quickly found themselves struggling through a dense jungle of mimosa bushes whose low-level branches covered in sharp thorns slowed progress and caused havoc among both troops and transport animals.

Some 6 miles out of Suakin, McNeill came across an open area of about half a mile square from where he telegraphed back to Suakin proposing that he stop and build a zeriba within the clearing. The reply instructed him to do as he proposed and that in the circumstances, the plan to build a second zeriba at the 8 mile point should be cancelled.

=== Tofrek Zeriba ===
"Zeriba" or "zareba' is a native word meaning "an improvised stockade; especially, one made of thorn bushes". This is exactly what was to be constructed. Mimosa trees had to be cut down, arranged in line to form the walls of the enclosure, stacked up to a height and density to afford protection to the garrison enclosed within it, their trunks being tied together prevent them from being dragged away by the enemy. Additional protection was provided by a cordon of entrenchments with sandbag parapets around the inside perimeter of the stockade. Construction of the zeriba was the responsibility of the Royal Engineers and Madras Sappers with British and Indian troops assisting in the work of cutting the trees and dragging them into position. Others were tasked with unloading water and stores and with protecting the working parties from enemy attack. Those that could be spared were ordered to rest within the protection of the zeriba, few having had much opportunity to sleep during the preceding night.

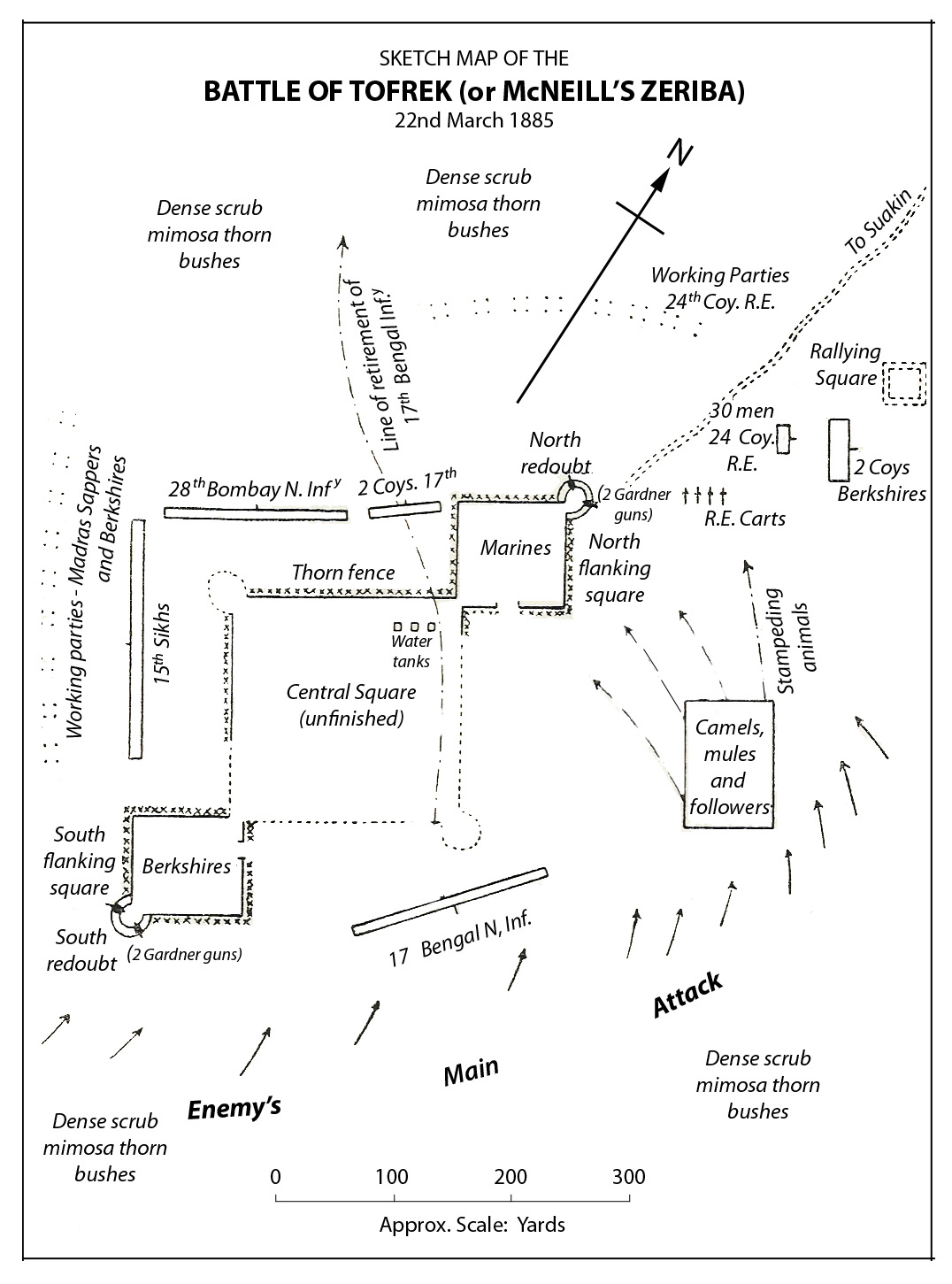
Sketch map showing disposition of troops etc. during Battle of Tofrek 22nd March 1885

The diagram at right illustrates the disposition of troops etc. immediately before and during the battle. Indian troops were positioned along the northern, southern and western perimeters of the (unfinished) zeriba. The two redoubts were manned by British troops – the Royal Marine Light Infantry in the completed northern redoubt and half of the Berkshire battalion in the uncompleted southern one. Working parties of engineers and others were completing the zeriba's walls. Outside the zeriba, on the eastern side, the other half the Berkshire battalion guarded the camels and mules, preventing them from straying into the bush as they awaited the march back to Suakin.

By 2:00pm, the northeastern redoubt was largely complete, and work was concentrated on the southern one. With their rifles piled inside the redoubt, parties of men were at work out on the western edge of the clearing out in front of the Sikh lines, felling trees to complete the redoubt. It was expected that the southern redoubt would have been completed by 3:00pm, when the second half of the Berkshire battalion would withdraw inside it while the transport returned to Suakin under the protection of the Cavalry, Engineers, Indian battalions and others.

== Battle ==
Around 2:45 pm scouting Lancers reported to McNeill that the enemy was gathering south and west of the zeriba and advancing towards it. McNeill immediately ordered all working parties to retreat back into the zeriba and to take up their arms, when at the same moment the Cavalry galloped into the clearing with large numbers of Arabs hard on their heels.

The main attack came from the south and west of the zeriba. The British and Indian troops held their ground except for the Bengal contingent lined up on the south side, who were thrown into disorder by the Cavalry and Arabs charging through their lines. After firing a few scattered volleys, the Bengalese turned and fled for cover inside the zeriba.

Large numbers of Arabs who had forced entry into the southern redoubt were quickly dispatched by the half-battalion of Berkshires defending it, 112 bodies later being counted inside the enclosure Meanwhile, the Arabs succeeded in stampeding the transport animals towards the central square and the northern redoubt, thereby gaining cover for themselves as they attacked from the eastern side. An eyewitness recalled: "Everything seemed to come at once: camels, transport of all kinds, water carts, ammunition mules, 17th Native Infantry, Madras Sappers, sick-bearers, Transport Corps, Cavalry and Arabs fighting in the midst. All these passed close to me, and went out on the other side of the zeriba, carrying away with them a number of the Marines and Officers who eventually got together and returned. The dust raised by this crowd was so great that I couldn't see anything beyond our zeriba for a minute or two, and it was impossible to see who was standing or what was likely to happen. The men behaved splendidly and stood quite still. It was the highest test of discipline I shall ever see."

By 3:15pm after an engagement lasting no more than 25 minutes, the battle ended. The Arabs lingered for another hour threatening further action, but at 4:15 they finally withdrew leaving large numbers of their dead and wounded behind. Further isolated attacks were made by injured Arabs and by some feigning death, it being reported that "when our men sought to afford aid to some of the enemy who could not walk, the latter crawled towards them with their spears between their teeth, striving even yet to slay a Kaffir." One officer was killed by an Arab who had lain outside the zeriba pretending to be dead.

== Aftermath ==
It was estimated that over 1,000 Mahdists died out of an attacking force in excess of 2,000. The tally of dead and wounded amongst the British and Indian troops was more accurately estimated as follows:

- Killed: 4 officers, 66 men, plus 34 "followers";
- Injured: 8 officers, 125 men, plus 18 "followers";
- Missing: 1 officer, 35 men, plus 122 "followers".

Several of the missing, including large numbers of "followers" (camel drivers etc.) were subsequently found, however the above figures for dead and wounded were almost certainly underestimates since they were produced immediately after the battle and therefore did not include those who subsequently died of their injuries, or those among the missing who were later found dead or injured.

The following day the British buried their dead to the northern and western sides of the zeriba, while the Indians cremated theirs according to their custom. The bulk of the force then returned to Suakin bringing the wounded with them.

The zeriba remained garrisoned until 6 April after which it was abandoned. On 1 May, a reconnaissance party passed by the site to find that the zeriba had been burned and destroyed by the enemy, ending its short and rather purposeless existence.

Within two months, the Gladstone government, in pursuing its anti-imperialist policies, took the opportunity provided by the Panjdeh crisis to abandon both the railway and Britain's military campaign in Sudan. General Graham and his Suakin Field Force were evacuated from the port city on 17 May 1885.

=== Post Mortem ===
The book "The Battle of Tofrek, fought near Suakin, March 22nd 1885" by William Galloway was written shortly after the battle. It appears that the writer's intention was to correct several erroneous statements that appeared in both official and press reports of the battle. Galloway was particularly critical of General Graham's planning of the Tofrek expedition on three counts:

1. Compared to the earlier expedition to Hashin which Graham commanded himself, which had been protected by four squadrons of British cavalry and a regiment of Bengal cavalry acting as scouts, the Tofrek expedition which he delegated to the command of General McNeill had only one squadron of Lancers plus a company of Mounted Infantry to provide warning of enemy activity;
2. Whereas Graham had the protection of a battery of Royal Horse Artillery able to shell the enemy at long range, no artillery was assigned to McNeill's force;
3. Whereas the ratio of men to transport animals had been over 5:1 in the earlier expedition, it was no more than 2:1 for the later one, resulting in much greater difficulties in keeping control of the animals.

Galloway was even more critical of Graham for his last-minute change to McNeill's marching orders when he instructed the column to march southwestwards into uncharted territory instead of following the established track towards Tamai as originally planned, and which Graham himself had used when attacking Tamai the year before. In consequence McNeill and his troops found themselves struggling through a jungle of mimosa bushes with long low-lying branches covered in sharp thorns which made progress both slow and difficult while affording the enemy excellent cover for the surprise attack that they launched later in the day.

Galloway also claimed that intelligence reports that the enemy was planning a major attack on the 22nd March were not passed on to McNeill before he left Suakin.
