= 15th Ludhiana Sikhs =

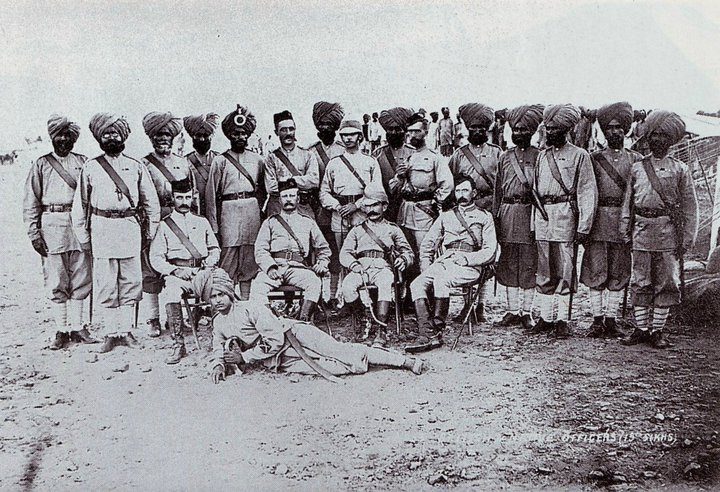
- Active: 1846-1922
- Country: Indian Empire
- Branch: Army
- Type: Infantry
- Part of: Bengal Army (to 1895); Bengal Command
- Uniform: Red; faced green, 1905 emerald green
- Engagements: 1861 - 62 China; 1878 - 80 Afghanistan; 1880 Ahmed Khel; 1880 Kandahar; 1885 Suakin; Tofrek; Chitral; Punjab Frontier; Tirah

Commanders
- Colonel-in-Chief: Edward VII (1904)

The 15th Ludhiana Sikhs was an infantry regiment in the British Indian Army. They could trace their origins to 1846, when they were known as the Regiment of Ludhiana (or the Loodiana Regiment). During the Indian Mutiny they were relied upon to hold Benares throughout the period of the Mutiny. In 1861, they became the 15th Bengal Native Infantry and shortly afterwards to the 15th (Ludhiana) Regiment of Bengal Native Infantry in 1864. Further changes in title followed they became the 15th Regiment of Bengal Native Infantry (Ludhiana Sikhs) in 1885, the 15th (Ludhiana) Sikh Infantry in 1901 and the 15th Ludhiana Sikhs following the Kitchener reforms of the Indian Army in 1903. To honour the visit of the Prince and Princess of Wales to Indian they took part in the Rawalpindi Parade 1905.

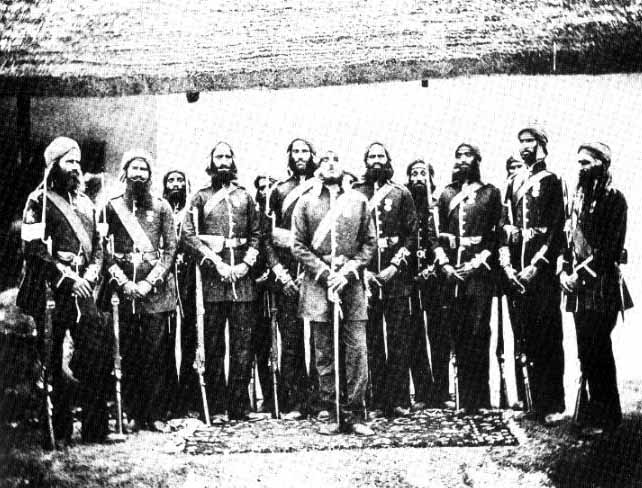
The Ludhiana Sikh Regiment in China, Circa 1860, during the Second Opium War

During this time they took part in the Battle of Ahmed Khel and the Battle of Kandahar in the Second Anglo-Afghan War. They then took part in the Battle of Tofrek and Suakin in the Mahdist War, the Chitral Expedition and the Tirah Campaign and World War I. During World War I they were part of the 8th (Jullundur) Brigade, 3rd (Lahore) Division they served on the Western Front in France, in Egypt as part of the Western Frontier Force, and in the Mesopotamia Campaign.

After World War I the Indian government reformed the army again moving from single battalion regiments to multi battalion regiments. The 15th Ludhiana Sikhs now became the 2nd Battalion, 11th Sikh Regiment. This regiment was later allocated to the new Indian Army after independence.

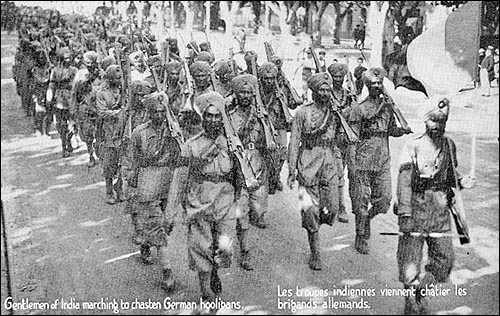
The 15th Sikhs being given a heroes' welcome upon their arrival in Marseille, France, during the First World War.

== Victoria Cross ==
Lieutenant John Smyth 15th Ludhiana Sikhs, was awarded the Victoria Cross, the United Kingdom's highest award for bravery in combat. The citation for this award, published in The London Gazette read:

For most conspicuous bravery near Richebourg L'Avoue on 18th May, 1915. With a bombing party of 10 men, who voluntarily undertook this duty, he conveyed a supply of 96 bombs to within 20 yards of the enemy's position over exceptionally dangerous ground, after the attempts of two other parties had failed. Lieutenant Smyth succeeded in taking the bombs to the desired position with the aid of two of his men (the other eight having been killed or wounded), and to effect his purpose he had to swim a stream, being exposed the whole time to howitzer, shrapnel, machine-gun and rifle fire.

== The 15th Ludhiana Sikhs and the Senussi ==
In 1914, during the World War I the 15th Ludhiana Sikhs operated as part of the 8th (Jullundur) Brigade, 3rd Lahore Division on the Western Front in France, but were moved to Egypt in the late 1915 to fight against the Senussi, a tribal sect of Muslims led by Sayed Ahmed, also known as the Senussi. The devout Muslims were trained in battle and assisted by several Ottoman military officers. The support received from the influential Ottoman leader Nuri Killigil brought the Senussi a considerable advantage while fighting off the Italian occupiers of Libya. When the German submarines started aiding the Ottomans and the Senussi by bringing weapons to Libya and attacking the coast of Egypt, Nuri Bey, half-brother of Enver Pasha, the Ottoman War Minister at the time, persuaded Sayed Ahmed to fight against Britain and join forces with the Ottoman Empire to invade Egypt in the Sinai and Palestine campaign.

The Senussi were given the first mission in Egypt after a German submarine sank two British ships in November 1915 off the western coast of Egypt. They were given the task of keeping the survivors of the attacks on Tara and Moorina in captivity. Two British outposts were afterwards attacked by the Senussi at Sidi el Barrani and Sollum, persuading the British Headquarters located in Cairo to give orders of withdrawal. British troops posted west of Matruh withdrew, leaving behind in their haste the Egyptian Coastguards at Sollum, most of whom deserted the British and joined forces with the Senussi.

=== Wadi Senab ===
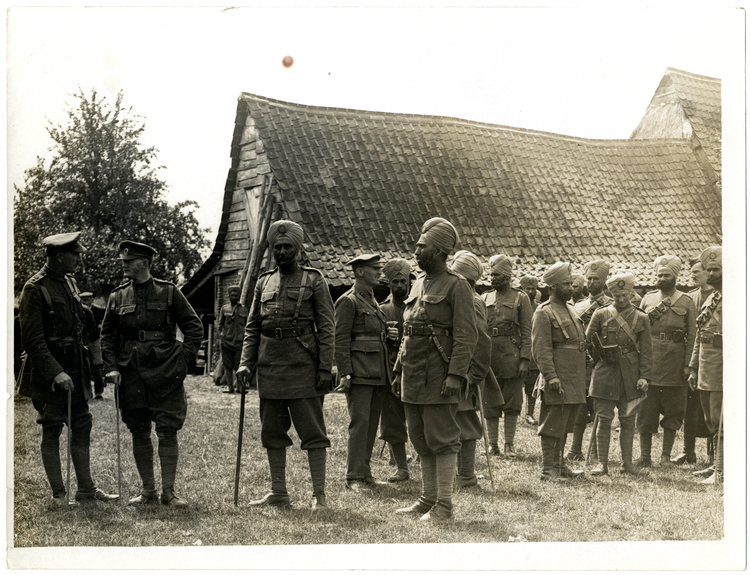
British and Indian officers, 15th Sikhs, Le Sart, France

On 20 November 1915 the Western Frontier Force was formed with Commander Major-General Alexander Wallace in the lead. The Western Frontier Force consisted of an infantry brigade containing partially trained battalions, the 2/7th and 2/8th Middlesex, the 15th Ludhiana Sikhs and the 6th Royal Scots, and the cavalry brigade containing three British Yeomanry regiments. The 15th Sikhs represented the regular major unit of the Western Frontier Force. The garrison placed at Matruh gathered more than 1,300 men by December, while the Senussi numbered with approximation over 2,000 men in that area.

The 15th Ludhiana Sikhs were given the first mission against the Senussi on 11 December when General Wallace appointed Lieutenant-colonel J.L.R. Gordon leader of a column and gave him the task of breaking the ranks of the enemy at Duwwar Hussein. The column sent also consisted of the Notts Battery with guns, armoured cars and the 2nd Composite Yeomanry Regiment. The first clash with the enemy in the Wadi (valley) Senab turned favorably only when the squadron of Australian Light Horse intervened and helped the cavalry. Gordon left one company of the 15th Ludhiana Sikhs behind to protect the camp and planned to march towards Duwwar Hussein using two routes. While the British soldiers were driven back by the heavy trained Senussi without engaging in battle, No. 2 Company of the Sikhs, who were appointed as the advanced guard, started firing and fighting back winning some mounts. While the enemy's flank increased and the British cavalry couldn't reorganize in time, the advanced guard, the 15th Sikhs were ordered to withdraw. Captain C.F.W. Hughes, the 15th Ludhiana Sikhs commander, decided to remain stationary in order to protect the wounded. With the combined help of the troops and the sloop, HMS Clematis, which fired at the Senussi with two 4-inch weapons, the enemy was forced back and the 15th Sikhs gained the opportunity to regroup and take care of the dead and the wounded.

'The enemy had been driven off, but had been able to retire unmolested, and must be given credit for the surprise and the vigour of his attack. Had the standard of training and the experience of the whole column been equal to those of the 15th Sikhs, the Senussi might have been heavily defeated.'

=== Conclusion ===
15th Sikhs were involved in the action around Wadi Majid and Halazin as well, until their orders were to proceed to India. The 15th Sikhs constituted a serious aiding force for the understaffed and untrained Western Frontier Force. The results obtained by this regiment were seen with distinction and 15th Sikhs were given the honour 'Egypt 1915-17.' After the Indian Army's post-war reforms, the regiment became known as the 2nd Battalion, 11th Sikh Regiment.

== Sources ==
- Barthorp, Michael; Burn, Jeffrey (1979). Indian infantry regiments 1860-1914. Osprey Publishing. ISBN 0-85045-307-0.
- Sumner, Ian (2001). The Indian Army 1914-1947. Osprey Publishing. ISBN 1-84176-196-6.
- McGuirk, Russell. The Sanusi's Little War.
- Carver, Marshall. The National Army Museum Book of the Turkish Front 1914-18.
- Duckers, Peter. Reward of Valor, The Indian Order of Merit 1914-1918.
- Chhina, Rana. The Indian Distinguished Service Medal.
- Macmunn, Lieut.-General Sir George; Falls, Captain Cyril. Official History of the War, Military Operations Egypt and Palestine, from the outbreak of war with Germany to June 1917.
