= Valentine Baker =

British soldier (1827–1887)

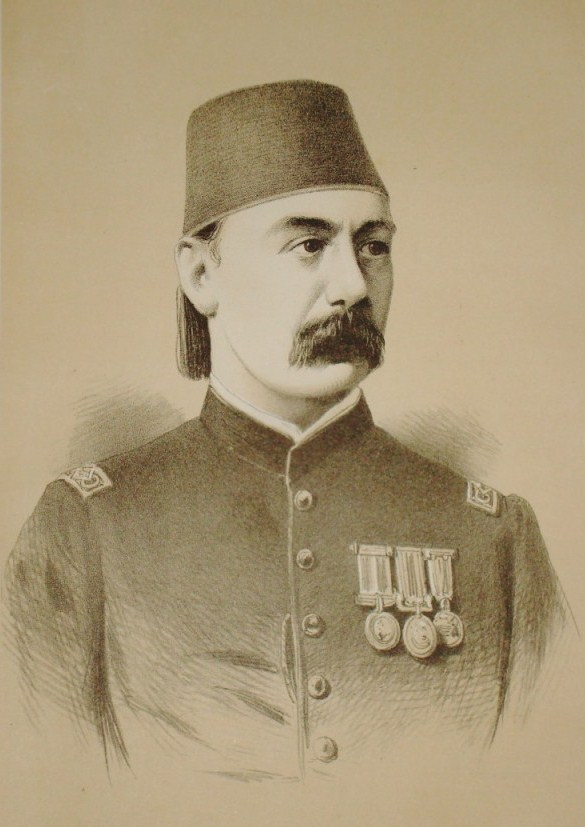
- Born: Valentine Baker; 1 April 1827; Enfield, United Kingdom
- Died: 17 November 1887 (aged 60); Tall al Kabir, Khedivate of Egypt
- Relatives: Sir Samuel Baker (brother)
- Military career
- Allegiance: United Kingdom; Ottoman Empire; Khedivate of Egypt
- Branch: British Army; Ottoman Army; Egyptian Army
- Service years: 1848–1875; 1877–1887
- Rank: Major; Ferik
- Nickname: Baker Pasha
- Units: Ceylon Rifle Regiment; 12th Lancers; 10th Hussars
- Commands: 10th Hussars; Egyptian police
- Conflicts: 8th Cape Frontier War; Crimean War; Battle of the Chernaya; Siege of Sevastopol (1854–1855); Russo-Turkish War (1877–1878); Battle of Tashkessen; Mahdist War; Battle of El Teb (WIA)

Valentine Baker (1 April 1827 – 17 November 1887), also known as Baker Pasha, was a British general and the younger brother of Sir Samuel Baker. He was most notable for his participation in the Russo-Turkish War (1877–1878) on the side of the Ottoman Empire.

== Biography ==
Baker was educated in Gloucester and in Ceylon, and in 1848 entered the Ceylon Rifles as an ensign. He soon transferred to the 12th Lancers, and saw active service with that regiment in the 8th Cape Frontier War of 1852–1853. In the Crimean War, Baker was present at the Battle of Chernaya River and at the fall of Sevastopol, and in 1859 he became major in the 10th Hussars, succeeding only a year later to the command. This position he held for 13 years, during which period the highest efficiency of his men was reached, and outside the regiment he did good service to his arm by his writings.

He went through the wars of 1866 and 1870 as a spectator with the German armies, and in 1873 he started upon a famous journey through Khorasan with his friend Fred Burnaby. Although he was unable to reach the Khanate of Khiva the results of the journey afforded a great deal of political, geographical and military information, especially as to the advance of Russia in Central Asia.

In 1874, he was back in England and took up a staff appointment at Aldershot.

The following year, Baker's career in the British army was ended by a scandal. He was arrested on a charge of indecent assault upon a young woman in a railway carriage. The woman, Rebecca Kate Dickinson, ended up clinging to the outside of the carriage to escape him. The matter went to trial and there was much public interest. Baker offered no defence, and was sentenced to a year's imprisonment and a fine of £500. He was then dismissed from the service.

Two years later, having left England, he entered the service of the Ottoman Army in the war with Russia. At first in a high position in the Ottoman Gendarmerie he was soon transferred to Mehmed Ali Pasha's staff, and thence took command of a division of infantry. With this division, Baker sustained the rearguard action of Tashkessen against the troops of Iosif Gurko. Promoted Ferik (lieutenant-general) for this feat, he continued to command Suleiman's rearguard. After the peace he was employed in an administrative post in Ottoman Armenia, where he remained until 1882. In this year he was offered the command of the newly formed Egyptian Army, which he accepted. On his arrival at Cairo, however, the offer was withdrawn and he obtained command only of the Egyptian police. In this post he devoted by far the greater amount of his energy to the training of the gendarmerie, which he realised would be the reserve of the purely military forces.

When the war in Sudan broke out, Baker, hastening with 3500 men to relieve Tokar, encountered the enemy under Osman Digna at El Teb. His men becoming panic-stricken at the first rush were slaughtered. Baker himself with a few of his officers succeeded by hard fighting in cutting a way out, but his force was annihilated. British troops soon afterwards arrived at Suakin, and Sir Gerald Graham took the offensive. Baker Pasha accompanied the British force, guiding it on its march to the scene of his defeat, and at the desperately fought second battle of El Teb he was wounded.

He remained in command of the Egyptian police until his death in 1887.

== Works ==
Among the books he wrote are Our National Defences (1860), War in Bulgaria, a Narrative of Personal Experience (London, 1879), Clouds in the East (London, 1876).

== Family ==
He married, on 13 December 1865, Fanny, only child of Frank Wormald of Potterton Hall, Aberford, by which marriage there were two daughters, the younger of whom only survived her father and married Sir John Carden, 5th Baronet.

== Bibliography ==
- Carr, William (1901). "Baker, Valentine" . In Lee, Sidney (ed.). Dictionary of National Biography (1st supplement). London: Smith, Elder & Co.
- Chisholm, Hugh, ed. (1911). "Baker, Valentine" . Encyclopædia Britannica (11th ed.). Cambridge University Press.
- Dorothy Anderson Baker Pasha: Misconduct and Mischance Michael Russell Publishing Ltd (May 1999) ISBN 0-85955-246-2 ISBN 978-0859552462
- Frank Jastrzembski Valentine Baker's Heroic Stand At Tashkessen 1877 A Tarnished British Soldier's Glorious Victory Pen & Sword (June 2017) ISBN 9781473866805
