= Charge of the Heavy Brigade at Balaclava =

The Charge of the Heavy Brigade at Balaclava may refer to:

- An event during the Battle of Balaclava
- The Charge of the Heavy Brigade at Balaclava (poem) by Lord Alfred Tennyson
- Charge of the Heavy Brigade (painting), work by Godfrey Douglas Giles
- The Charge of the Heavy Brigade at Balaklava by William Simpson (Scottish artist)
