= Hadendoa =

Ethnic group of Sudan, Egypt and Eritrea

Regions with significant populations
- Sudan: 63,000 (2012)
- Eritrea: 20,000 (1970)
- Egypt: Unknown

Languages
- Beja (Bidhaawyeet)

Religion
- Islam

Related ethnic groups
- Other Beja

Hadendoa (or Hadendowa) is the name of a nomadic subdivision of the Beja people, known for their support of the Mahdiyyah rebellion during the 1880s to 1890s. The area historically inhabited by the Hadendoa lies today in parts of Sudan, Egypt and Eritrea.

== Etymology ==
According to Roper (1930), the name Haɖanɖiwa is made up of haɖa 'lion' and (n)ɖiwa 'clan'. Other variants are Haɖai ɖiwa, Hanɖiwa and Haɖaatʼar (children of lioness).

== Language ==
The language of the Hadendoa is a dialect of Bedawi.

== History ==
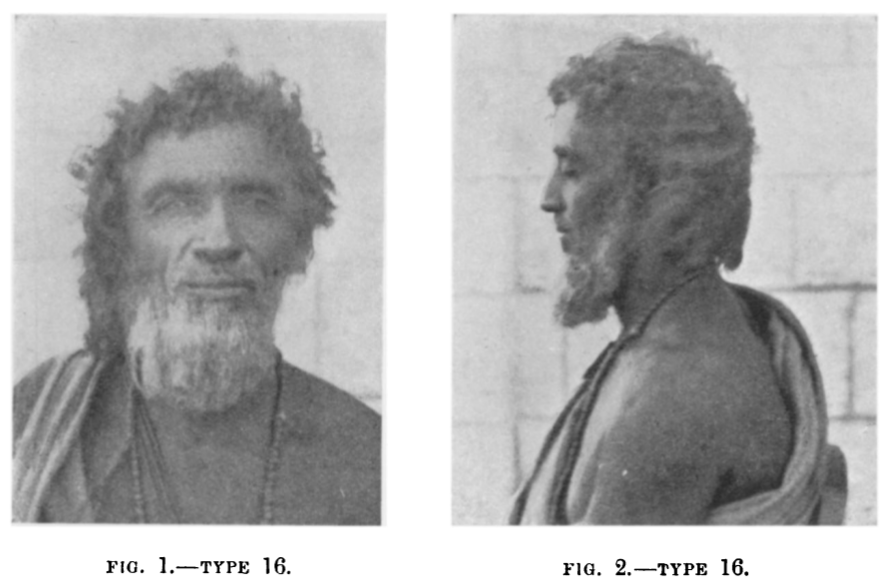
Hadendowa man, Sudan, 1913, by C. G. Seligman

The southern Beja were part of the Christian kingdom of Axum during the sixth to fourteenth centuries. In the fifteenth century, Axum fell to the Islamization of the Sudan region, and although the Beja were never entirely subjugated, they were absorbed into Islam via marriages and trade contracts. In the seventeenth century, some of the Beja expanded southward, conquering better pastures. These became the Hadendoa, who by the eighteenth century were the dominant people of eastern Sudan, and always at war with the Bisharin.

Extensive anthropological research was done on Egyptian ethnic groups in the late 1800s and a number of skulls of people of Hadendoa individuals were taken to the Royal College of Surgeons to be measured and studied.

The Hadendoa were traditionally a pastoral people, ruled by a hereditary chief, called a Ma'ahes. One of the best-known chiefs was a Mahdist general named Osman Digna. He led them in the battles, from 1883 to 1898, against the Anglo-Egyptian Sudan (the United Kingdom and Egypt were exercising joint sovereignty in Sudan. They fought the British infantry square in many battles, such as in the Battle of Tamai in 1884 and in the Battle of Tofrek in 1885 and earned an enviable reputation for their bravery. After the reconquest of the Egyptian Sudan (1896–1898), the Hadendoa accepted the new order without demur.

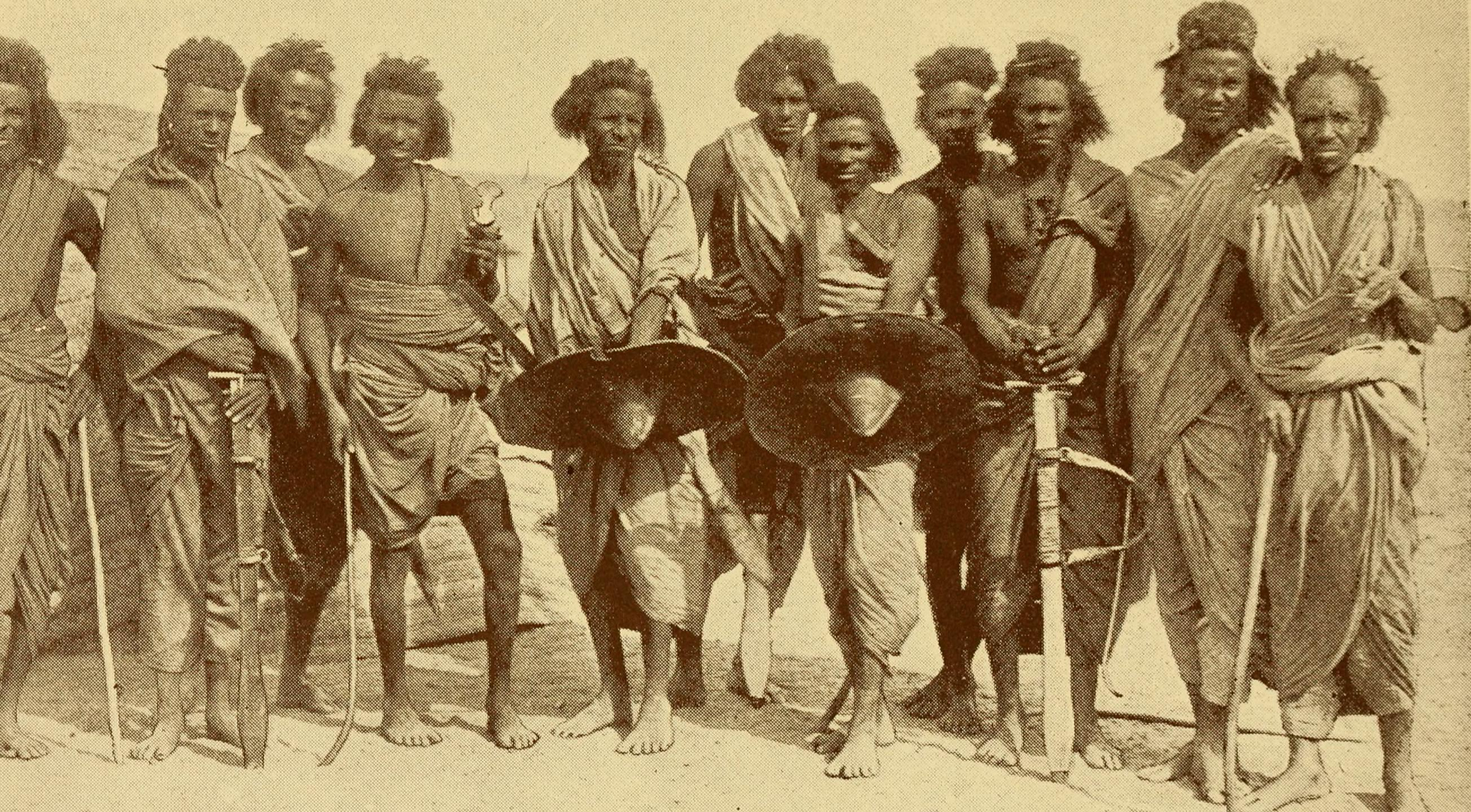
Group of Hadendowa, 1893

In World War II, the Hadendoa allied themselves with the British against the Italians.

== In popular culture ==
- Their elaborately styled hair gained them the name "Fuzzy-Wuzzy" among British troops during the Mahdist War, after which Rudyard Kipling wrote the poem of the same name.
- Corporal Jones, a character in the British TV series Dad's Army, frequently referred to the "Fuzzy-Wuzzies" when discussing his exploits in the army of Lord Kitchener.
- In the 1968 film, Chitty Chitty Bang Bang, character Grandpa Potts reminisces about his time as a batman in the British Army in Africa, saying, "When my brigadier went into action, the Fuzzy-Wuzzies were so blinded by the shine on his boots, they couldn't see to fight."

== See also ==
- History of the Anglo-Egyptian Sudan
- Islamization of the Sudan region
- Mahdist State
