= Battle of Suakin =

- Part of the Mahdist War
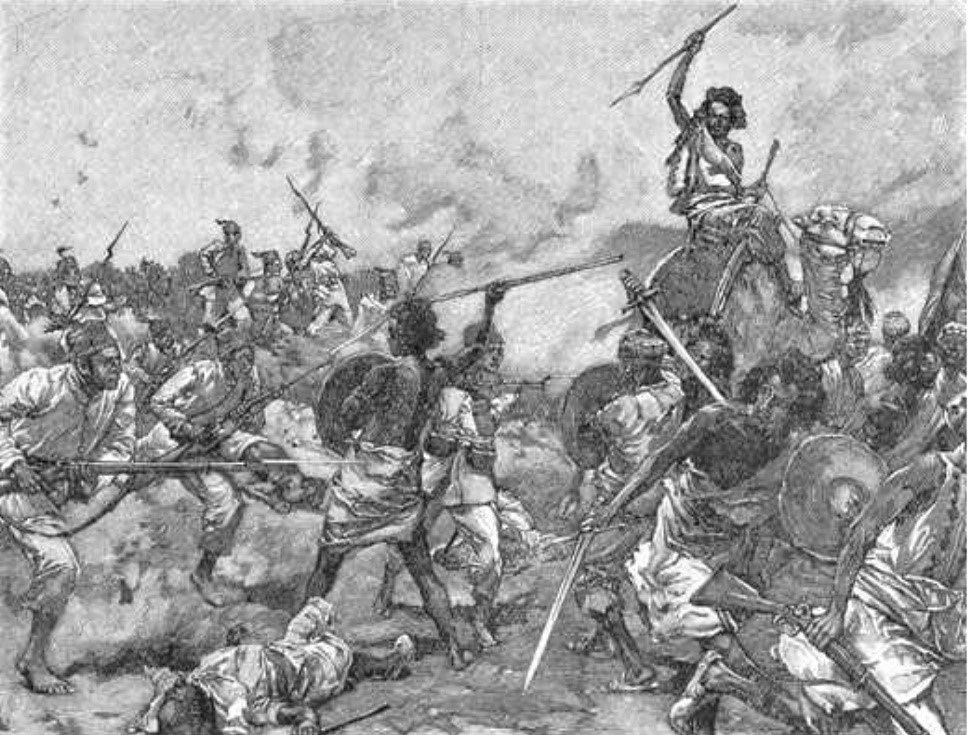
- Battle of Suakin
Date	20 December 1888
Location	Suakin, Eastern Sudan
Result	Anglo-Egyptian victory

Belligerents
(United Kingdom of Great Britain and Ireland) United Kingdom * India; Egypt	Mahdist State

Commanders and leaders
(United Kingdom of Great Britain and Ireland) Francis Grenfell	Osman Digna (WIA)

Casualties and losses
12 killed	1,000 killed

The Battle of Suakin (also known as the Battle of Gemaizah), occurred on 20 December 1888 during the Mahdist War, when General Francis Grenfell defeated a Mahdist (Often called Dervishes by Europeans), force near Suakin, a chief port of Sudan.

The Mahdist force, under Osman Digna, had advanced on Suakin with an intention to invest it. From Suakin, General Grenfell launched a sortie against the Mahdists, who were attempting to capture the Water Forts. After one and a half hours of fighting, the casualties were 12 on the Anglo- Egyptian side and 1,000 on the side of the Mahdists. After this, the Mahdists withdrew, removing any threat to Suakin.

General Kitchener was present, commanding an Egyptian Army brigade comprising Sudanese troops, this being the first battle where units of the Egyptian Army played a significant part since its reform by the British. They performed well in battle, enhancing the reputation of both the reformed Egyptian Army and of General Kitchener.

In the battle, three of the swords of the 20th Hussars broke short, an incident which later caused debate in the House of Commons of the United Kingdom.

Egyptian and British forces present received both the Egypt Medal with clasp 'Gemaizah 1888' and the Bronze Khedive's Star.

== Forces ==
The British forces involved in the battle were:

- Royal Navy
- 20th Hussars
- 2nd Battalion, King's Own Scottish Borderers
- 1st Battalion, Welch Regiment
- 1st Battalion, Royal Ulster Rifles
