= Godfrey Douglas Giles =

British soldier and artist (1857–1941)

Godfrey Douglas Giles (9 November 1857 Karachi – 1 February 1941) was a painter of horses, military scenes and battles, many experienced firsthand while on service with the British Army in India, Afghanistan, Egypt and South Africa. He produced numerous caricatures for the magazine Vanity Fair.

== Biography ==
Giles was the son of Captain Edward Giles of the Royal Navy who was stationed at Karachi. Godfrey Douglas Giles was a boarding boy at Cheltenham. He was sent to the Royal Military College, Sandhurst, to launch his military career, and his first posting was in India in 1875. He saw action in the Second Afghan War with the 1st Sind Horse and the 19th Native Infantry, chiefly on the Khleat and Kandahar fronts, and according to one obituary notice, had been present at Maiwand. He certainly was present at the battle of Khuski-Nakhud in February 1879 and later painted the Charge of the Scinde Horse at Khuski-Nakhud. He also painted a scene of E/B Battery Royal Horse Artillery at Maiwand which was exhibited in 1893. It was drawn from details supplied by RSM Paton and Sergeant Mullane, VC who had been with the battery.

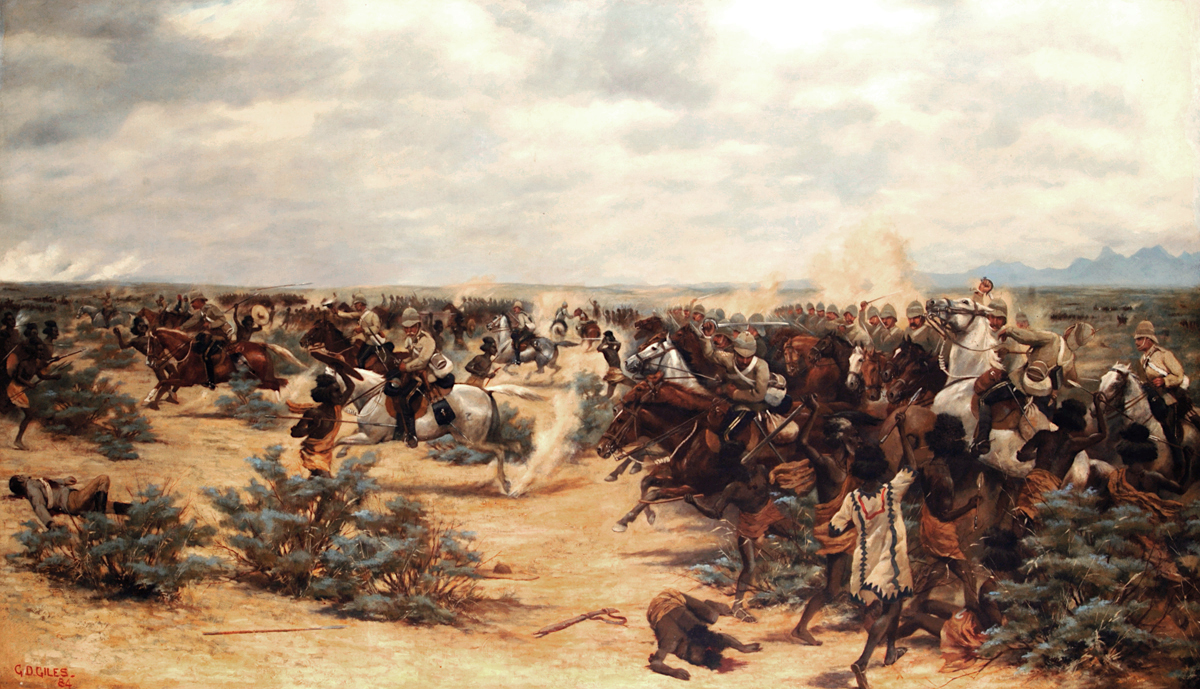
Battle of El Teb (Godfrey Douglas Giles)

He accompanied the Gordon Relief Expedition to Sudan and commanded Turkish cavalry at El Teb. Giles also provided a sketch of the battle which was the basis for a large fold-out panorama of the battle published in The Graphic on 1 March 1884, and began painting a scene of the battle when he returned to Cairo shortly after the event. He was also present at the battle of Tamai, and later received a commission from Lieut. P.S. Marling of the 60th Rifles depicting the latter saving Private Morley of the 35th Regiment for which Marling received the Victoria Cross. Subsequently, Giles served as captain in the Loyal Suffolk Hussars and the Artists' Rifle Corps.

Having attained the rank of Major, Godfrey Douglas Giles retired from the army in 1884 and went to Paris in 1885 where he studied under Carolus-Duran. He successfully exhibited paintings such as The Battle of Tamai and El Teb at the Paris Salon and the Royal Academy after which he settled in Newmarket where he was able to depict horses and horse-racing scenes. His illustrations also appeared in the weekly Black & White Budget in 1891.

After the outbreak of the Boer War in South Africa in 1899, Giles was sent there as war correspondent and artist by The Graphic and the Daily Graphic, and was attached to French's 1st Cavalry Brigade. He witnessed the surrender of General Piet Cronjé after the Battle of Paardeberg, and was present at the subsequent relief of Kimberley. Later he wrote a piece for The Graphic titled "With French to Kimberley and Roberts to Bloemfontein" which appeared in The Graphic History of the South African War. Giles contributed greatly to the pictorial record of the Boer War with works on display in museums in both South Africa and England. He was awarded the Queen's South Africa Medal on 12 February 1903.

Giles died at the age of 83 in Edinburgh on 1 February 1941.

== Paintings ==
- Norman Ramsay's Guns at Fuentes De Onoro, 5 May 1811 (1897 - Royal Artillery Institution)
- Charge of the Heavy Brigade (Private Collection)
- The Battle of Tamai, Soudan Campaign, 1884 (1885 - National Army Museum)
- An Incident at the Battle of Tamai, Eastern Soudan, March 13, 1884 (Private Collection)
- The Battle of Tamaii (1885 - York and Lancaster Regiment Trust, on loan National Army Museum)
- Charge of the 10th Hussars at El Teb (1884 - HorsePower: The Museum of the King's Royal Hussars)
- After the Battle of Atbara. The Emir Mamoud brought prisoner to Sir H. Kitchener (1899 - National Army Museum)
- Cronje's Laager, Paardeberg, 18 February 1900 (1900 - National Army Museum)
- Advance on Kimberley (1901 - Queen's Royal Lancers)
- To the Relief of Kimberley (1901 - National Army Museum)
- A Troop of the 10th Hussars racing the Boers for a kopje above the Modder River (1902 - King's Royal Hussars)
