= Suakin-Berber Railway =

British military project on the Red Sea coast in Sudan

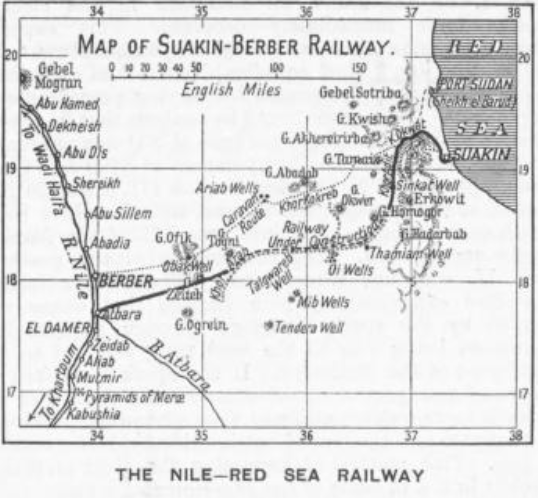
Suakin-Berber railway

The Suakin-Berber railway on the Red Sea coastal region in Sudan was a short-lived military project that never reached completion. Its construction began in February 1885, being intended to provide a connection between Berber on the River Nile and Suakin on the Red Sea littoral for the rapid deployment of troops and military equipment in Britain’s involvement in the Mahdist War.

In May 1885, after barely three of months of work during which only 20 of the intended 280 miles of track had been laid, at a cost approaching £1 million, Britain suspended its war with the Mahdi, pulled out of the Sudan and terminated the Suakin-Berber railway.

The escalating difficulties and costs of building the railway served to provide ammunition to Gladstone's opponents in Parliament and in so doing helped in bringing down his second administration.

== Background ==
In 1883 Britain became involved in hostilities against the Mahdi revolt, sending General Gordon to Khartoum to organize the evacuation of military and civilian staff and families. In March 1884 Khartoum came under siege with Gordon and several thousand civilians trapped within its defenses. The British government vacillated for six months before ordering General Garnet Wolseley to lead a mission to rescue Gordon and the beleaguered inhabitants of the city. Wolseley sailed up the River Nile from Cairo in early January 1885, but was too late to save Gordon who was murdered by Mahdist forces on 26 January.

== Railway construction ==
The idea of building a military railway to provide a supply route for Wolseley's force was promulgated in June 1884 when the British government sent a company of Royal Engineers to Suakin to build jetties and to prepare the port as a railway depot. Wolseley, however, argued against the idea, preferring to use the Nile for transportation. Thus it was only after the failure of his expedition in January 1885 that the railway plan was resurrected.

In February 1885 a contact was hurriedly let to British contractors Lucas and Aird to build the 280 mile (400 km) line between Suakin and Berber over difficult and largely unexplored terrain, in order that Berber could become a base of operations against Khartoum. The contract required Lucas and Aird to work under the direction of General Sir Gerald Graham, commander of the Suakin Field Force that had been sent out to protect the railway against rebel attack.

Construction work was impeded by the poor quality labour force and by the (second hand) materials and rolling stock sent out from Britain - a situation that was exacerbated by attacks and sabotage by the enemy.

== Change of policy and fall of government ==
In April 1885, the Panjdeh incident in which Russian forces seized Afghan territory and thereby threatened India, gave the Gladstone government justification to pursue its anti-imperialist policies by terminating British involvement in the Sudan. On 20 April Hartington, (Secretary of State for War), announced his intention to withdraw from the Sudan war and by 25 April Graham was instructed to stop the line at Otao, some 20 miles from Suakin and 200 miles from Berber, this being reached on 30 April.

The announcement to withdraw from Suakin and to abandon the railway created uproar in Parliament. In Egypt the news caused dismay. On May 17 the evacuation of the Field Force began. General Graham sailed from Suakin on the same day. On May 18 Wolseley informed the Government that he had stopped work on the railway and on the next day he left for Cairo. On the 29th the staff of Lucas and Aird sailed for England. While they were at sea the Gladstone Government fell.

== Abandonment and aftermath ==
The abandoned railway lay disintegrating in the rains of the Red Sea summer. What had not been damaged by the rain had been torn up by the local population. The financial consequences of the venture were even more depressing: in round figures the total expenditure on the railway, after all adjustments had been made, amounted to £865,000, or approximately £45,000 for each mile of track.

Of the thousands of pounds worth of railway material left derelict on the ground little was used again. The Egyptian Railway Authority was persuaded to purchase much of the (standard gauge) rolling stock that had been bought for the Suakin-Berber railway. This was shipped from London to the (3 ft. 6 in. gauge) Sudan Railway at Wadi Halfa.

Five of the standard gauge locomotives destined for the Suakin-Berber railway ended up in the hands of the Royal Arsenal Railway in Woolwich together with an unspecified number of bogie wagons. It is likely that some of the trackwork was also returned to UK and laid near Woolwich, where it remained in use for many years.

According to Rail transport in Sudan and w:de:Bahnstrecke Atbara–Port Sudan a railway was built from 1904 to 1906 on a similar path between Atbara and Port Sudan.
