= Gerald Graham =

British Army officer (1850–1890)

Lieutenant-General Sir Gerald Graham VC GCB GCMG
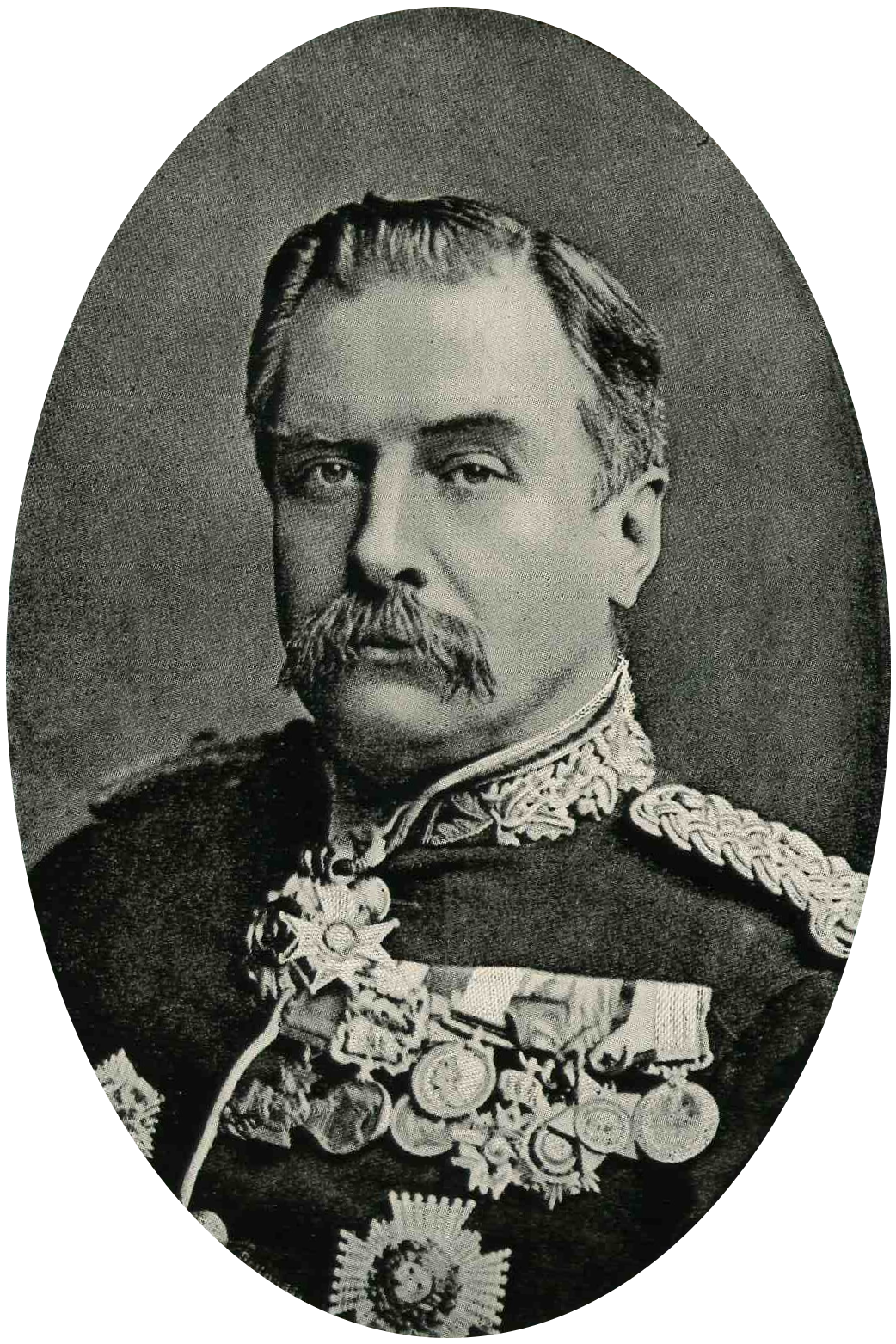
- Born: 27 June 1831; Acton, London
- Died: 17 December 1899 (aged 68); Bideford, Devon
- Burial place: East-the-Water Cemetery, Bideford
- Military career
- Allegiance: United Kingdom
- Branch: British Army
- Service years: 1850–1890
- Rank: Lieutenant-General
- Units: Royal Engineers
- Commands: Suakin Expedition; 2nd Infantry Brigade; 23rd Field Company, Royal Engineers
- Conflicts: Crimean War; Siege of Sevastopol; Second Opium War; Third Battle of Taku Forts; Anglo-Egyptian War; Battle of Tell El Kebir; Mahdist War; Battle of El Teb; Battle of Tamai; Battle of Tofrek
- Awards: Victoria Cross; Knight Grand Cross of the Order of the Bath; Knight Grand Cross of the Order of St Michael and St George; Knight of the Legion of Honour (France); Order of the Medjidie (Ottoman Empire)
- Other work: Colonel Commandant of the Royal Engineers

Lieutenant-General Sir Gerald Graham, VC, GCB, GCMG (27 June 1831 – 17 December 1899) was a senior British Army commander in the late 19th century and an English recipient of the Victoria Cross, the highest award for gallantry in the face of the enemy that can be awarded to British and Commonwealth forces.

As an officer of the Royal Engineers, he served in the Crimean War, China, Canada, and Africa — including as a Brigadier General in the Anglo-Egyptian War, under Garnet Wolseley, and as commander of the Suakin Expedition against Mahdist Sudan in 1884–85.

In February 1884, Graham accompanied his close friend and colleague Charles George Gordon up the Nile to Gordon's disembarkation at Korosko, making Graham one of the last Englishmen to see Gordon alive before he set out across the Nubian Desert on his fateful mission to Khartoum. In 1887 Graham commemorated Gordon, reflecting on his life, character, and the context of the Mahdist War, in a publication entitled “Last Words with Gordon”.

== Early life ==
Graham was born in Acton, Middlesex to Frances (née Oakley), of Oswaldkirk, Yorkshire, and Robert Hay Graham, of Eden Brows, north Cumberland, a medical doctor and descendent of Clan Graham.

After studying at Wimbledon and Dresden he was admitted (1847) to the Royal Military Academy at Woolwich where he passed third out of his batch and received a commission as a Second Lieutenant in the Royal Engineers on 19 June 1850. He subsequently completed his military training in the School of Military Engineering at Chatham.

As a young man, he was noted for his strong and imposing stature, reaching a height of 6 feet 4 inches (1.93 m) – a quality ultimately remarked upon throughout his career – as well as a reserved but kind disposition and a fondness for boating on the Medway.

== Crimea & Victoria Cross ==
Graham was ordered to the 11th Company of Royal Sappers and Miners at Woolwich and shipped to Gallipoli in April 1854 to engage in the building of defensive works at the Gulf of Saros. He then served in the Crimea at the battles of Alma, Inkerman, and the Siege of Sebastopol where his actions at the assault of the Redan on June 18, 1854, earned him the award of a Victoria Cross.

The ill-fated attack on the Russian fortifications consisted of three columns (1,600 men each) with 23 year old Lieutenant Graham in command of the ladder party at the head of Number 1 column. Notably, Charles George Gordon was in command of the same column's reserves - a former peer of Graham's at the Royal Academy and subsequent close friend and colleague through later campaigns in China and the Sudan.

Commencing their offensive after dawn, the Number 1 column became pinned down by heavy Russian fire as it endeavoured to close on the right flank of the Redan across approximately 400 yards of open, level ground. Graham later recalled:

Before five minutes were over we had lost many men, without making much advance. My Brother officer proceeding me [Lieutenant Murray] had his arm shot off and died shortly afterwards. Brigadier General Sir J. Campbell had been killed at the outset, having with extraordinary valour, gone out in front of the skirmishers. Colonel Tylden of the Royal Engineers ... was struck down by a grapeshot whilst I was at his side.

Graham carried Tylden to the rear before returning to the action but after numerous attempts to move forward and suffering severe casualties, the column retired to their advance trench. At this point, Graham and sapper John Perie gallantly scaled the parapet and returned to the field under withering grape and musket fire to retrieve wounded comrades.

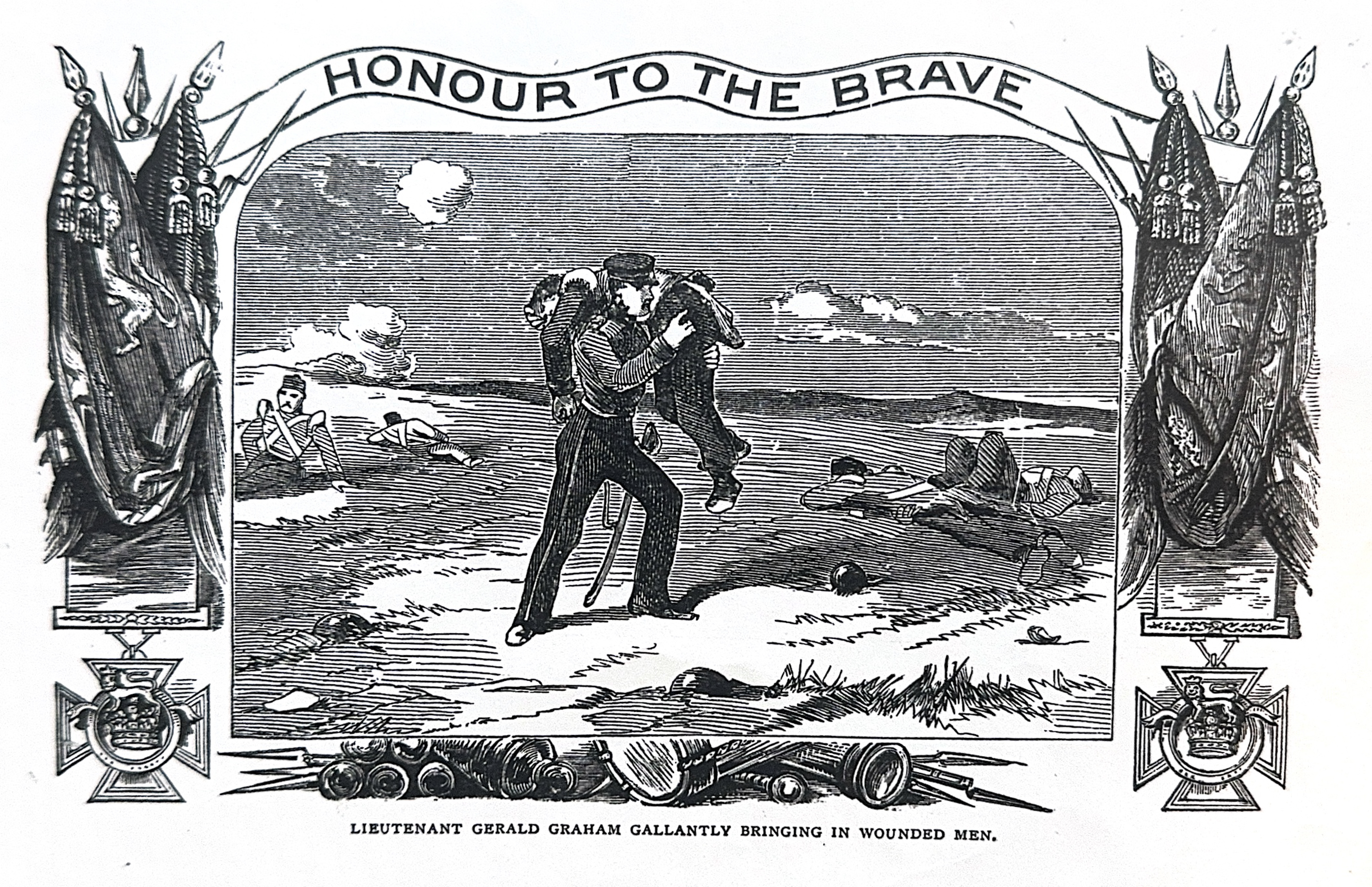
An illustration depicting Graham, from The Victoria Cross in The Crimea, 1881.

Lord West, who succeeded command of Graham's column following the death of Sir John Campbell, later wrote to Lieutenant General Betnick, "...Lieutenant Graham of the Engineers, who lead the ladder party, evinced a coolness and readiness to expose himself to any personal risk which does him the greatest credit." The citation for Graham's VC, published in the London Gazette, noted his "Devoted heroism in sallying out of the trenches on numerous occasions, and bringing in wounded officers and men."

Four weeks later, Graham was struck in the face by debris from a canon round-shot while on engineer duty with Garnet Wolseley. Seriously wounded and temporarily blind, he spent two months recovering in Therapia before returning to the front in time for the fall of Sebastopol. The remainder of his campaign was occupied with demolishing the city's dockyard.

For his actions in the Crimea Graham was awarded the Victoria Cross, twice mentioned in dispatches, made a Knight of the French Legion d'honneur, received the 5th Class of the Order of the Medjidie, and promoted to brevet major.

At the inaugural VC ceremony in Hyde Park, on 26 June 1857, Graham was personally decorated by Queen Victoria, who pierced his chest while pinning the Cross to his coat.

== Second Anglo-Chinese War ==
Following his return to England, Graham served as acting-adjutant at Aldershot until August 1858, when he was ordered to India due to the ongoing war of Indian Mutiny. However, by the time he arrived in Lucknow and assumed command of the 23rd Company of Royal Engineers the conflict was practically over and his outfit was sent on to Canton in fall of 1859 in anticipation of war with the Qing Dynasty.

With the onset of the Second Anglo-Chinese war in the spring of 1860, Graham's company joined the 2nd Division of the British army assembling at Kow-loon, near Hong Kong island, under the command of Marjor-General Sir Robert Napier.

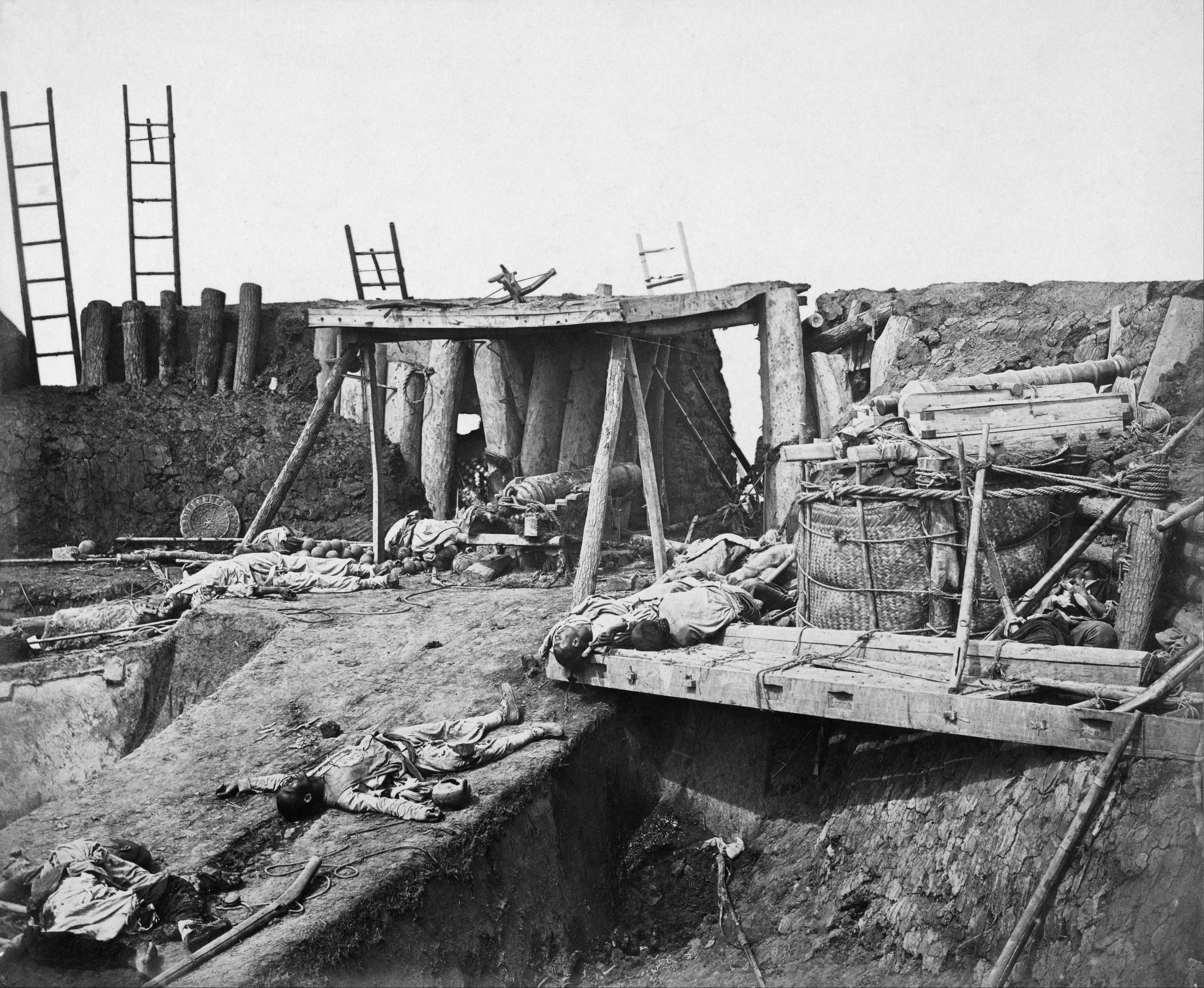
Interior of the Taku north fort immediately after its capture

During the storming of the Taku forts on 21 August 1860, Graham again demonstrated exceptional courage and skill under heavy fire. While commanding his sappers in the laying of a pontoon bridge across a defensive ditch, he was struck in the leg by a gingal-ball. Despite his wound, Graham mounted his horse and continued directing his men from horseback until his mount was also hit, finally forcing him to withdraw.

Once recovered, Graham rejoined his sappers for the march on Peking, where they occupied the Anting gate after the city's capture. He was present for Lord Elgin's entrance into Peking and attended the signing of the Convention of Peking on 24 October 1860. Here Graham again crossed paths with Charles Gordon, who would remain on in China and take command of the Ever Victorious Army in 1863.

For his actions in China Graham was mentioned in dispatches, received the war medal with two clasps and made brevet lieutenant-colonel.

== Mid career ==
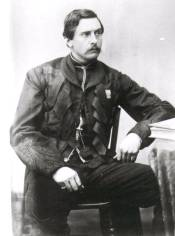
Photo from the Royal Engineers Library with permission

Following his return to England in 1861, he was for 16 years Commanding Royal Engineer successively at Brighton, Aldershot, Montreal, Chatham, Manchester, and York.

In 1877 he was appointed assistant director of works for barracks at the War Office and accompanied Lord Airey to observe German army manoeuvres in Dusseldorf, where they were hosted by Emperor Wilhelm I. In 1881 he was promoted to major general.

== Anglo-Egyptian War ==
In 1882, Sir Garnet Wolseley, tasked with putting down the Urabi Revolt in Egypt, selected Graham to command the 2nd Infantry Brigade in the 1st Division of his expeditionary army.

On August 19, Graham sailed with Sir Garnet and an advanced force from Alexandria, arriving at Port Said the following morning. He was then dispatched in a gunboat with 600 men along the Suez canal to Ismailia.

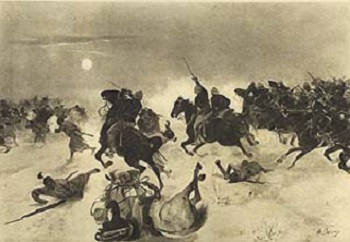
Cavalry charge at the Battle of Kassassin

From Ismailia Graham pushed up the Sweet Water Canal, and by the 28th had occupied the strategically crucial Kassassin lock and bridge with a force of 1,900 men. Short on food and ammunition after days of desert marching, the British unit was caught in a surprise assault by a 9,000-strong force under Urabi Pasha. Despite being outmanned and outgunned – fielding only 4 artillery pieces to the Egyptians' 12 – Graham’s force held their position all day and, upon reinforcement by the Household Cavalry, drove the enemy back for an unlikely victory against greatly superior numbers.

Following Graham’s success, Wolseley consolidated the British position, amassing his entire army at Kassassin and repulsing an Egyptian counterattack there on September 9. He then resolved to strike a decisive blow by marching – under the cover of night – on Urabi’s force entrenched at Tel-el-Kebir. The pre-dawn advance, on 13 September, was organized with Graham’s 2nd Brigade leading the 1st of two columns, arranged by division.

Upon contact with the Egyptian lines at 5 a.m., Graham personally led his men over the works through overwhelming musket and artillery fire, pushing the enemy back. Once across the entrenchments, Graham directed his brigade against Egyptian forces amassing in the rear before reforming and marching in close order to secure high ground.

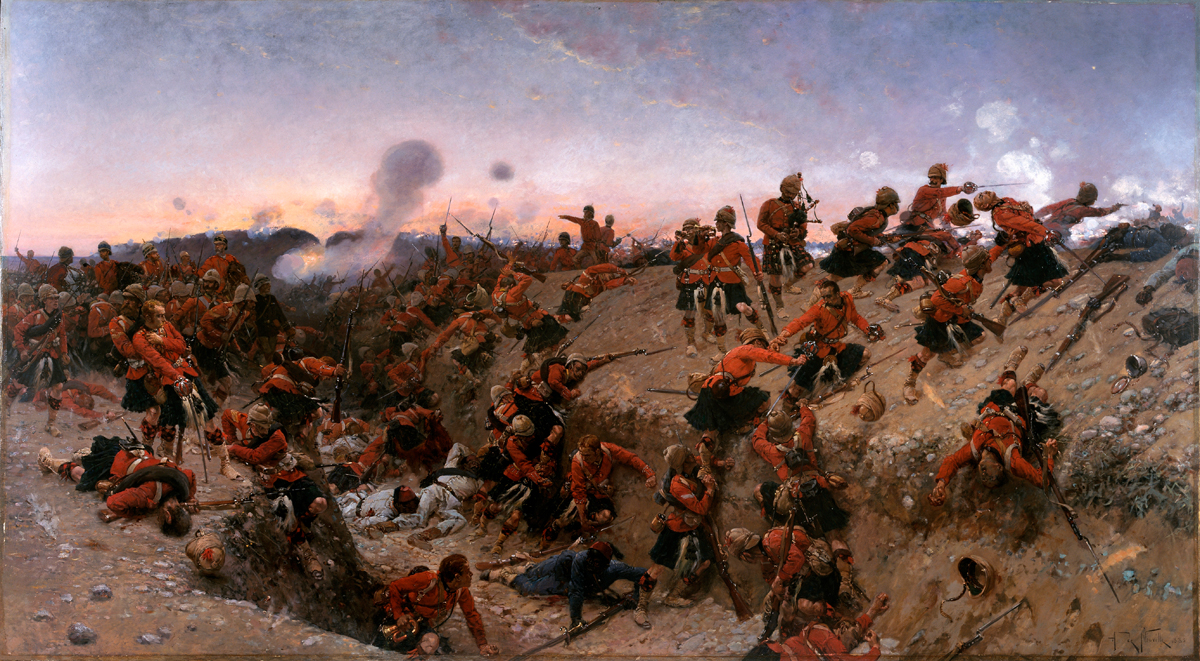
British forces scaling the Egyptian works at the battle of Tel El Kebir

The British cavalry carried ahead another 65 miles to capture Cairo, completing the Egyptian rout and ending Urabi Pasha’s rebellion. In a dispatch dated September 24, Wolseley summarized that, “The brunt of the fighting throughout the campaign fell to the lot of Major-General G. Graham, V.C., C.B., Commanding the 2nd Brigade, and it could not have been in better hands. To that coolness and gallantry in action for which he has always been well known he adds the power of leading and commanding others.”

An army of occupation was formed under Sir Archibald Allison and Graham remained in Cairo to command an infantry brigade. Upon his return to England in June 1883, he was celebrated by the Royal Engineers at Chatham and dined with Queen Victoria at Osborne.

For his service Graham was mentioned five times in dispatches, thanked by both houses of Parliament, received the Egypt Medal with clasp, the Bronze Star, the Second Class of the Medjidie, and made a K.C.B. on November 18, 1882.

== Sudan & Suakin Expeditions ==
By early 1883, a rebellion led by the Mahdi Mohammed Ahmad had spread across much of the Sudan, which at that time was under Egyptian control. The Red Sea port of Suakin was threatened by Mahdist tribes, particularly the Hadendowa, who’s leader Osman Digna routed an Egyptian relief force under Valentine Baker at el-Teb on February 4, 1884.

The British arranged for Egyptian withdrawal from the Sudan, supervised by Major-General Charles Gordon. In early February 1884, Graham accompanied Gordon by boat up the Nile to Korosko, where Gordon disembarked and set out across the Nubian Desert on his fateful mission to Khartoum. Graham later recounted this journey in his publication Last Words With Gordon, describing ‘… a gloomy foreboding that I should never see Gordon again.” at parting with his dear friend.

=== First Suakin Expedition ===
On returning to Cairo, Graham was appointed to command an expedition to the eastern Sudan to relieve the Egyptian garrison at Tokar and destroy Osman Digna, who was threatening Suakin. In a logistical feat, he arrived at Suakin on 22 February with 4,000 British troops and 14 guns. The conditions were harsh: extreme heat, scarce water, and barren desert plains covered with dense, thorn-laden mimosa scrub.

Graham moved his force by sea to Trinkitat, a post farther down the coast, then marched inland to Tokar, defeating Osman Digna in the battle of El-Teb on 29 February. British losses were 34 killed and 155 wounded, while enemy losses were estimated at 2,000 out of a strength of 6,000.

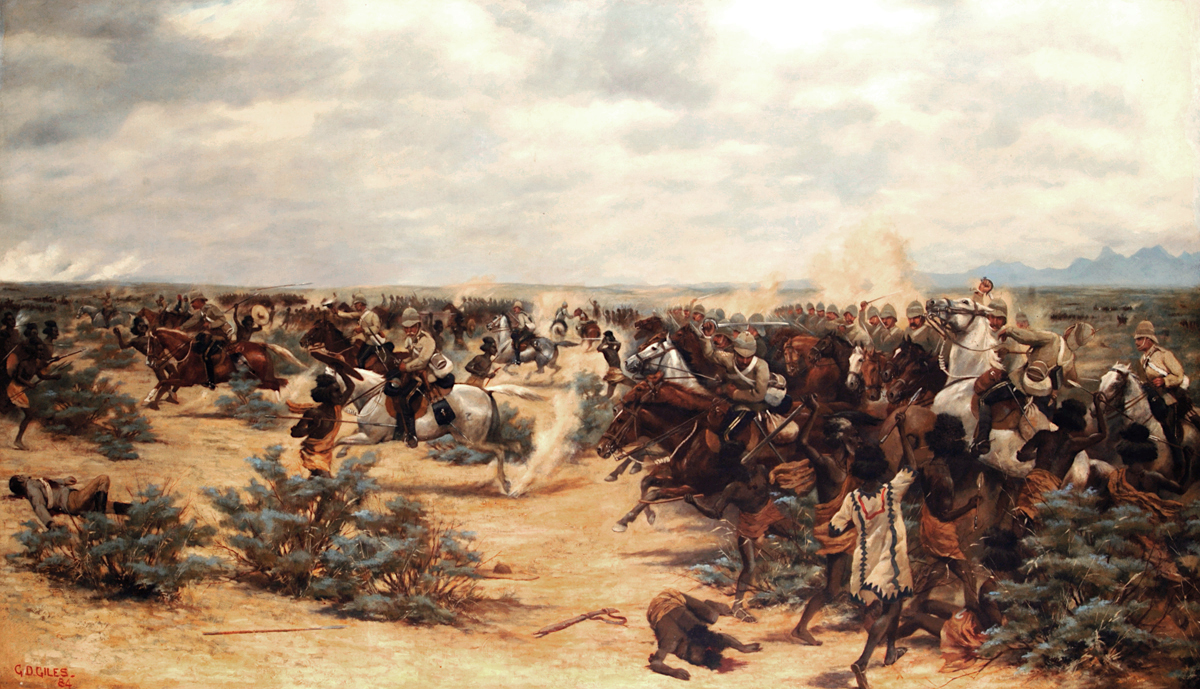
Cavalry charge at the second Battle of El Teb

Having moved back to Suakin by sea, Graham attacked Tamai, southwest of Suakin, on 13 March. He fought a successful battle, destroying the main Hadendowa village and a large store of ammunition before returning to Suakin. The Hadendowa fought fiercely; British casualties were 109 killed and 112 wounded, while Mahdist losses were estimated at 2,000 out of 12,000.

During this time, Graham had urged the government to open the Suakin-Berber route to reach Gordon at Khartoum, a proposal Gordon strongly supported. Although the suggestion was rejected, a scheme was prepared and reconnaissance made as far as Tambouk. After Tamai, Graham again unsuccessfully pressed for troops to be sent from Suakin to Berber, strongly supported by Sir Evelyn Baring, the British agent in Egypt.

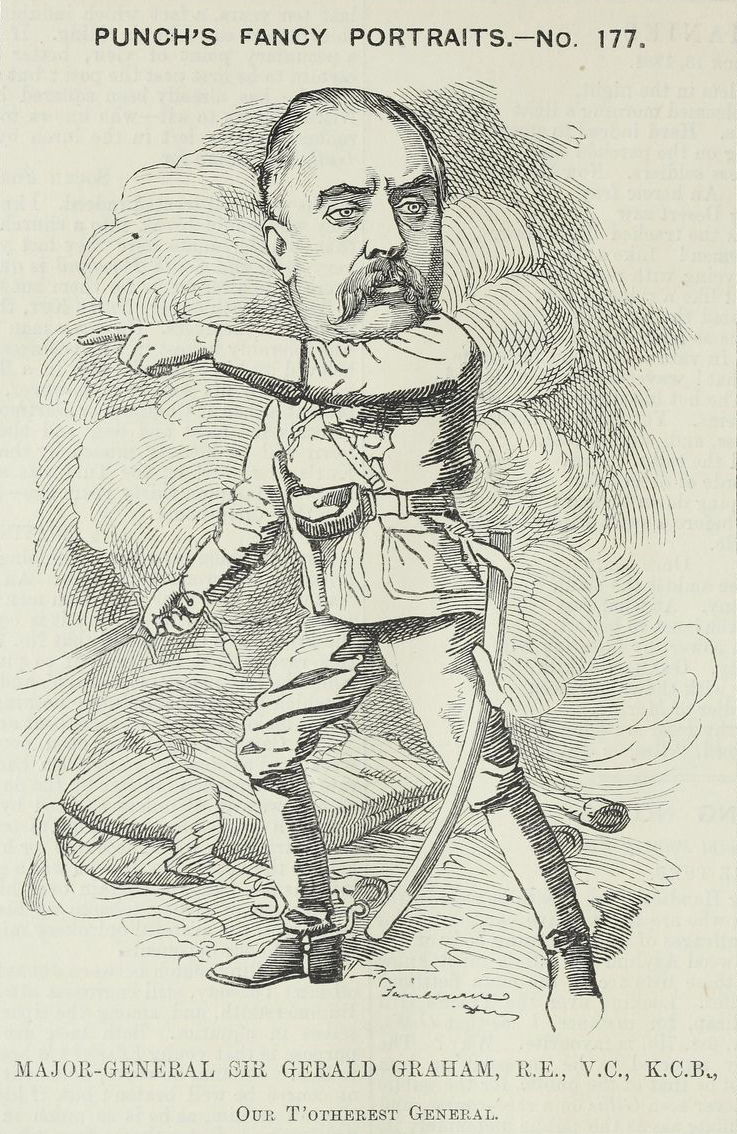
Punch caricature of Gerald Graham, March 22, 1884.

After occupying and destroying Tamanieb on 27 March, Graham was ordered to leave a garrison in Suakin and end the campaign. He returned to England on April 29 where he dined with Queen Victoria at Windsor, was celebrated by the Royal Engineers at Aldershot and Chatham, and was presented with a sword of honour by the 1st Newcastle and Durham volunteer engineers.

For his service in the Sudan he was thanked by both houses of parliament, received two clasps to his Egyptian medal, the grand cordon of the Turkish Medjidie, and was promoted to lieutenant-general for distinguished service in the field, which he chose in preference to an offer of baronetcy.

=== Second Suakin Expedition ===
In October 1885 a Nile expedition, under Lord Wolseley, was dispatched to relieve the siege of Khartoum, where Gordon’s situation was growing increasingly perilous. The expedition failed to reach the city before it fell on 25 January 1885. Gordon was killed, along with his entire garrison, prompting public outrage in Britain.

In response, the Gladstone government decided it was necessary to move decisively against the Mahdi. Graham was summoned on the 11 February to interviews with the Secretary of State for War, Lord Harrington, and with Prince George, Duke of Cambridge, where he was informed of his appointment to the command of a new Suakin expedition.

Wolseley was ordered to hold position on the Nile through the summer and prepare for an autumn campaign. Meanwhile, Graham’s force was to protect the Nile column’s flank by defeating Osman Digna and building a railway from Suakin toward Berber as quickly as possible, before the summer heat set in.

Before his departure from England, Graham was sent for by Queen Victoria, who received him at Windsor on 18 February and who expressed her support for his expedition and indignation at the circumstances of Gordon’s death. Graham departed with his senior staff on 20 February from Charing Cross, to great fanfare, and arrived in Suakin by way of Cairo, on 12 March.

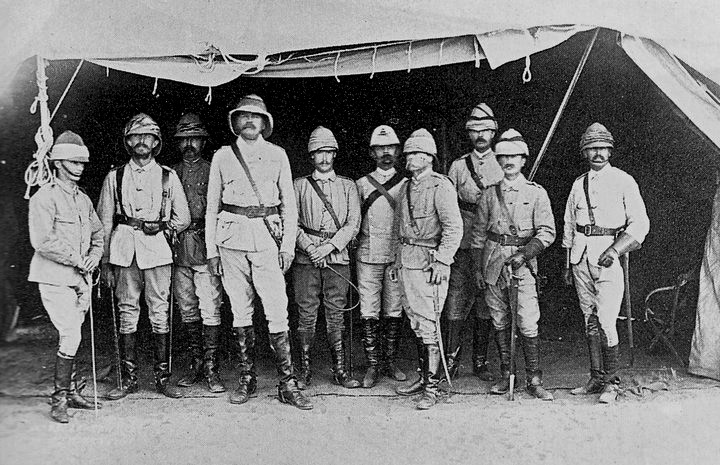
A group portrait of General Graham with his staff in Suakin, 1885

Graham's force was composed of 13,000 men, including British and Indian troops alongside – for the first time in British history – an Australian contingent, from New South Wales, as well as 11,000 labourers, camel drivers, and muleteers. He immediately began construction of the railway and his campaign against Osman Digna, who had gathered large forces of Hadendowa at Tamai and Hashin. With approximately 10,000 men, Graham stormed Hashin on 20 March, dispersing the enemy. He built and garrisoned a fortified post there and returned to Suakin.

He then advanced on Tamai, building intermediate posts along the way. The first of these was at Tofrek, located in thick bush with limited visibility about 6 miles from Suakin. The leading brigade under Major-General John McNeill was building a zeriba of thorn bushes when it was surprised, attacked, and nearly overwhelmed; McNeill lost 141 killed and 155 wounded before order was restored, as well as 501 camels, about a third of his transport. While the battle was a British victory, with over 1,000 enemy killed out of an estimated 2,000, including a number of chiefs, McNeil and Graham both later faced criticism for decisions that left the brigade vulnerable to attack.

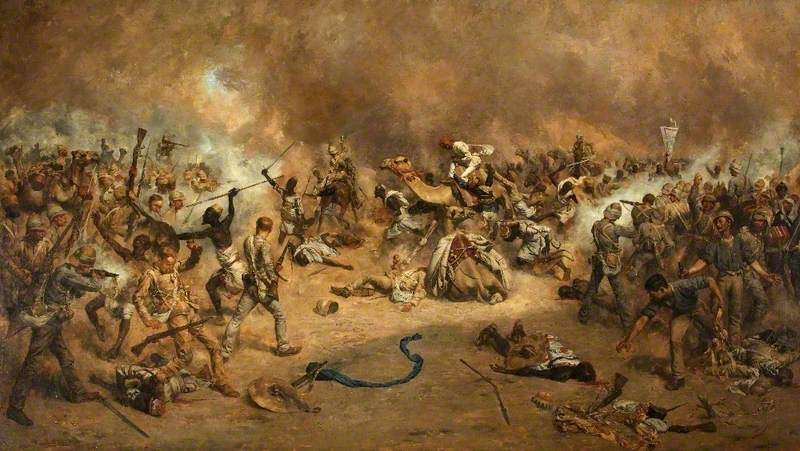
The Battle of Tofrek, 22 March 1885

After building up sufficient water and supplies at the zeriba, on 2 April Graham advanced on Tamai, driving Osman Digna into the mountains. Finding the village wells dry, Graham destroyed the settlement, large stores of ammunition, and returned his force to Suakin.

Having severely curtailed Osman Digna's power Graham pushed the Suakin-Berber railway forward for nineteen miles but progress was slow and increasingly behind schedule due to the difficult conditions, topography, and civilian contractors who proved hard to manage and were disliked both by the army’s officers and soldiers.

Meanwhile, the Gladstone government’s enthusiasm for the Sudan campaign was waning – the Panjdeh incident in Afghanistan, and the possibility of war with Russia, provided an opportunity to shift military priorities – and on 13 May Graham’s expedition was suspended. On 16 May, Graham embarked from Suakin with the Guards’ Brigade and arrived back in England on 14 June.

For his services in the campaign he received the thanks of both houses of parliament for a third time, was decorated with the Grand Cross of St. Michael and St. George, and had an additional clasp added to his Egyptian medal.

== Later Life & Death ==
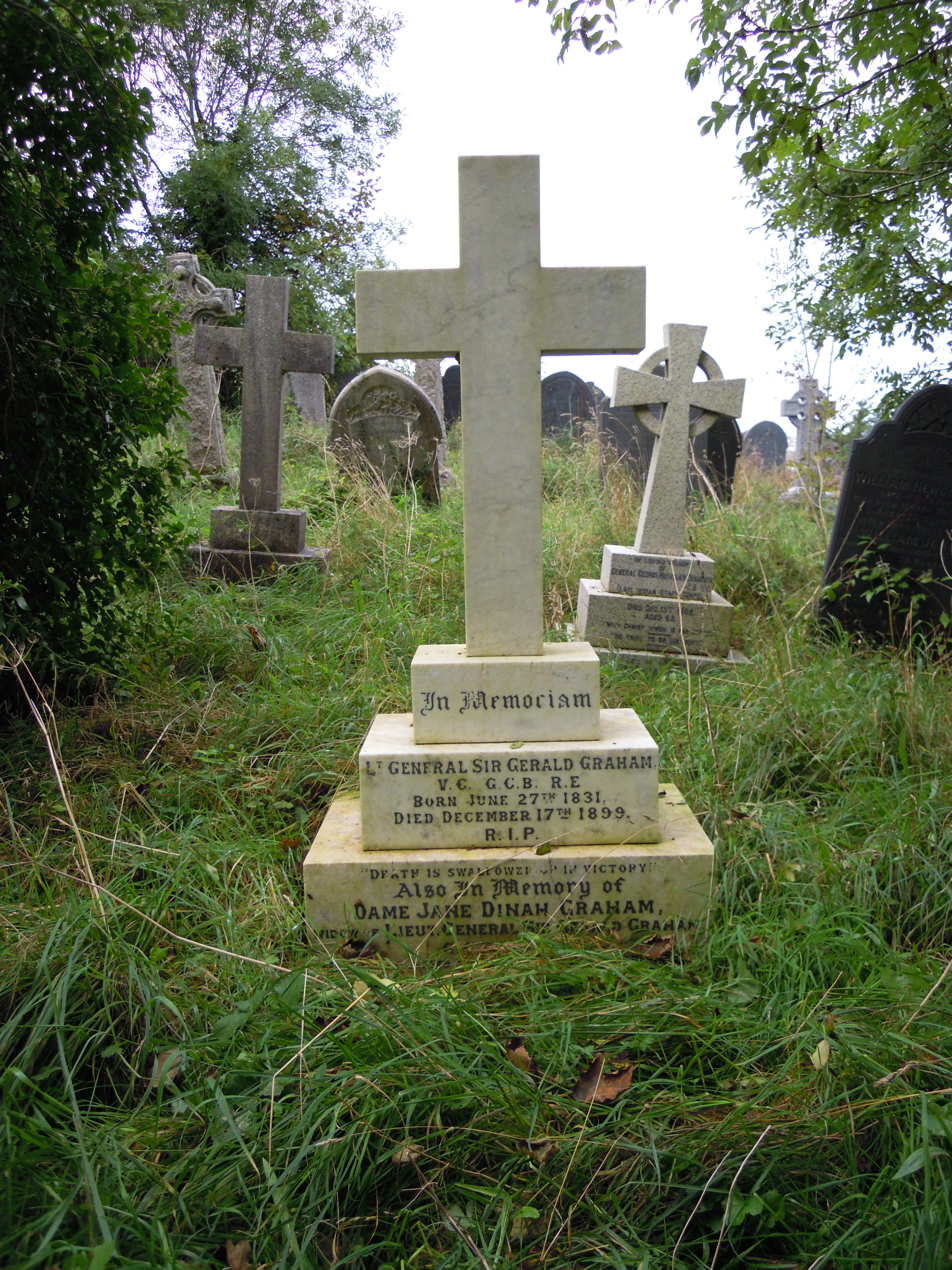
The grave of Gerald Graham VC in 2017. Behind it is the grave of George Channer VC

Graham was made a Knight Grand Cross of the Order of the Bath in 1896, and a colonel commandant of the Corps of Royal Engineers in 1899. He died at his home in Bideford on 17 December from pneumonia. He is buried in East-the Water Cemetery in Bideford, Devon in a grave adjacent to that of George Channer VC.

== The medal ==
His Victoria Cross is currently owned by Graham's great great great grandson Oliver Brooks and is displayed at the Royal Engineers Museum in Gillingham, England.

== Works ==
He published a number of scientific papers and a contribution to the Fortnightly Review, entitled "Last Words with Gordon" (1887), and prepared a translation of Goetze's Operations of the German Engineers and Technical Troops during the Franco-German War of 1870–71 (1875).
