= First and second battles of El Teb =

Battles fought near El Teb during the Mahdist War

Coordinates: 18°36′40″N 37°41′07″E

- Part of the Mahdist War
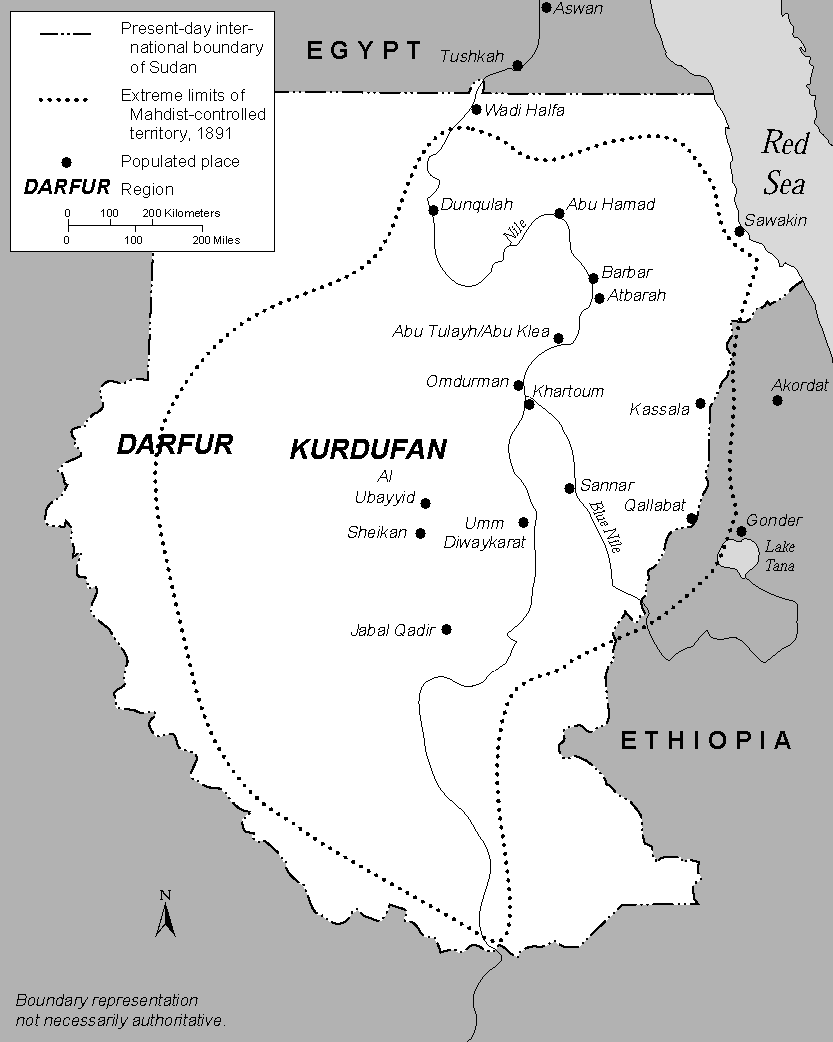
- Mahdist Sudan
Date	4–29 February 1884
Location	El Teb, 9 miles (14 km) southwest of Trinkitat
Result	4 February: Mahdist victory 29 February: British victory

Belligerents
Mahdist State	United Kingdom * India; Egypt

Commanders and leaders
Osman Digna	Valentine Baker; Sir Gerald Graham

Strength
4 February: 1,000 warriors 29 February: 10,000 warriors Unknown artillery	4 February: 3,500 Egyptian infantry 29 February: 4,500 British and Indian infantry and cavalry 22 artillery pieces 6 machine guns

Casualties and losses
4 February: Unknown 29 February: 2,000 killed Unknown wounded	4 February: ~2,700 killed or captured 29 February: 28 killed 142 wounded

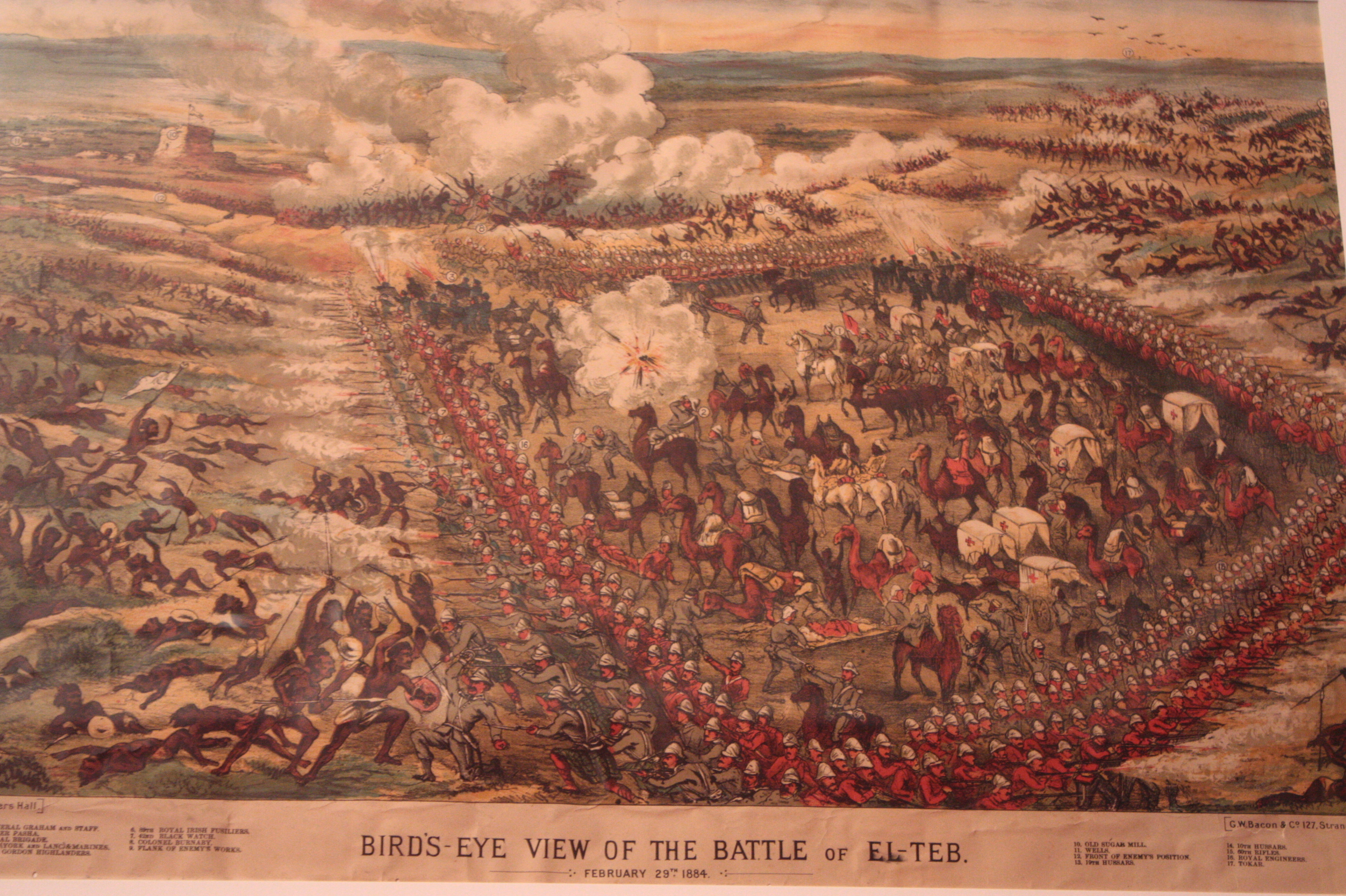
View of the Battle of El Teb 29 February 1884

The first and second battles of El Teb (4 February 1884 and 29 February 1884) took place during the British Sudan Campaign where a force of Sudanese under Osman Digna won a victory over a 3,500 strong Egyptian force under the command of General Valentine Baker which was marching to relieve Tokar on the 4th. A second British force under Sir Gerald Graham arrived on the 29th, engaging and defeating Osman Digna with few casualties.

== Background ==
Britain's involvement in Sudan was a consequence of its support for the Khedive of Egypt following the repression of Urabi Pasha's revolt in 1882. Despite Egypt still being nominally part of the Ottoman Empire, the Khedive's rule was dependent on direct British support, given to ensure the security of the Suez Canal and the elimination of the Sudanese slave trade.

However, the British government under Prime Minister William Ewart Gladstone sought to stay out of affairs in Egyptian-governed Sudan, that was threatened by an uprising led by the Mahdi, Muhammad Ahmad, who declared a Jihad, against the ‘Turks’, represented by the Egyptian troops. The Mahdist forces enjoyed considerable success against Egyptian troops in 1882 and 1883, and several towns garrisoned by Egyptian troops found themselves surrounded. In their haste to be rid of the Sudanese question, the British urged the Egyptians to evacuate their troops.

== Battle ==
=== Monday, 4 February 1884 ===
The port of Suakin, on the Red Sea, could be supplied by ship and still held out. But further inland, the towns of Tokar and Sinkat were completely cut off. In February 1884, a 3,000 strong force was dispatched from Suez to Suakin to relieve the beleaguered garrisons. The command of this force was entrusted to Baker Pasha accompanied by other European officers. From the start the expedition was beset with problems. The greater part of the infantry was formed from Egyptian Gendarmerie Battalions who had enrolled on the condition they would serve only for civil service in Egypt. On the news they were being sent to Sudan, many of them deserted, and the others grew dispirited and mutinous.

On Sunday, 3 February, Baker moved his force by ship from Suakin to Trinkitat, on the coast near Tokar. He set up a camp on the beach, and set off the next day. The Egyptians, who were not used to marching in formation, advanced in a confused mass. At the halting place of El Teb, on the road to Tokar they were attacked by a Mahdist force 1,000 strong. Despite their superiority in numbers and weaponry, the troops became panic-stricken, and fled after firing a single volley. The Mahdists caught up with them and inflicted huge losses, killing all the European officers who tried to resist. Baker, unable to rally his men, retreated to the camp with the few survivors and managed to protect it from the Mahdists. Of a force of 3,500, barely 700 returned.

After returning to Suakin, Baker tried to organize the defence of the city, but the Egyptian troops had grown distrustful of the British officers, and refused to obey. This defeat sealed the fate of the garrisons: the Sinkat garrison sallied out to try to reach Suakin on foot; they were massacred. The Tokar garrison surrendered without a fight.

=== Friday, 29 February 1884 ===
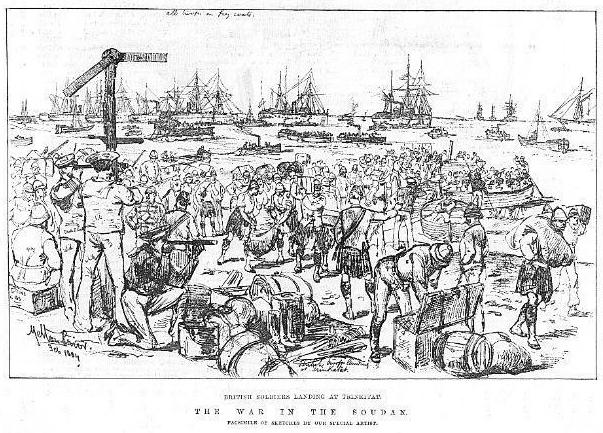
British soldiers landing at Trinkitat, February 1884 a sketch by Melton Prior

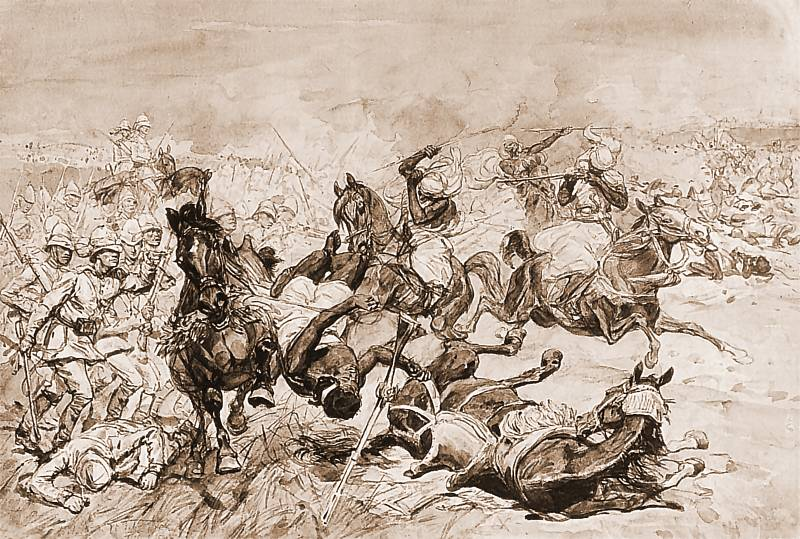
Second battle of El Teb by Józef Chełmoński

In Britain, Baker's defeat incensed the imperialist faction, represented by Lord Wolseley, who demanded the intervention of British troops. Reluctantly, the British government agreed and several units - Royal Irish Fusiliers on their way returning from India, 3 battalions from the Army of Occupation in Egypt, York and Lancaster Regiment from Aden and a battalion of Marines - were sent to Suakin.

On Thursday the 21st, the force under the command of Sir Gerald Graham left for El Teb, via Trinkitat. It was composed of 4,500 men (British and Indian soldiers) with 22 guns and 6 machine guns. On Friday the 29th, they approached the main Mahdist position, on a hill near El Teb. This position consisted of various entrenchments and rifle pits. The Mahdists also had several artillery pieces including Krupp guns captured from the Tokar garrison, some of whom had changed sides, and were now fighting for the Mahdists. The British, forming into a square, circled the Mahdist entrenchments to outflank them, under cover of dense rifle and cannon fire. After a brief artillery duel, the Mahdist guns were silenced, and the British advanced. The Mahdists hid in trenches to avoid incoming British rifle and artillery rounds, then rushed out in small groups of twenty to thirty warriors instead of the massive attack that was expected. Another tactic was to pretend to lie dead on the battlefield as British cavalry charged through, then, as the cavalry returned at a slower pace through the ranks of the 'dead', the Mahdists would rise up and slit the hamstrings of the horses then proceed to kill the riders. At the top of the hill, a village had been fortified by the Mahdists, and here they resisted. The British infantry had to clear the trenches with bayonets after which the fighting died down.

During the battle, Captain Arthur Wilson of HMS Hecla joined the right half-battery, Naval Brigade, in place of a lieutenant who was mortally wounded. As the troops closed on the enemy battery, the Mahdists charged out on the detachment which was dragging one of the guns, whereupon Wilson sprang to the front and engaged in single combat with some of the enemy, and so protected the detachment until men of the 1st Battalion, York and Lancaster Regiment, came to his assistance. For this action he was awarded the Victoria Cross.

Graham's force then advanced to Tokar, encountering no further resistance. After the battle, at a place called Dubba, most of the equipment lost by Baker's force was recovered (1,500 Remington rifles, 200 boxes of ammunition, one 7-pounder gun, and one Gatling gun), and 700 of the survivors from Tokar were escorted to Trinkitat. A party of the 42nd Regiment was sent out to bury the Europeans who fell in Baker's defeat.

The British suffered only light casualties, the Mahdist fire being generally inaccurate. Baker Pasha, who accompanied the force, was wounded in the jaw. The Mahdists suffered heavily from British firepower, with estimated 2,000 of them killed (though only 825 bodies were actually counted on the field of battle).

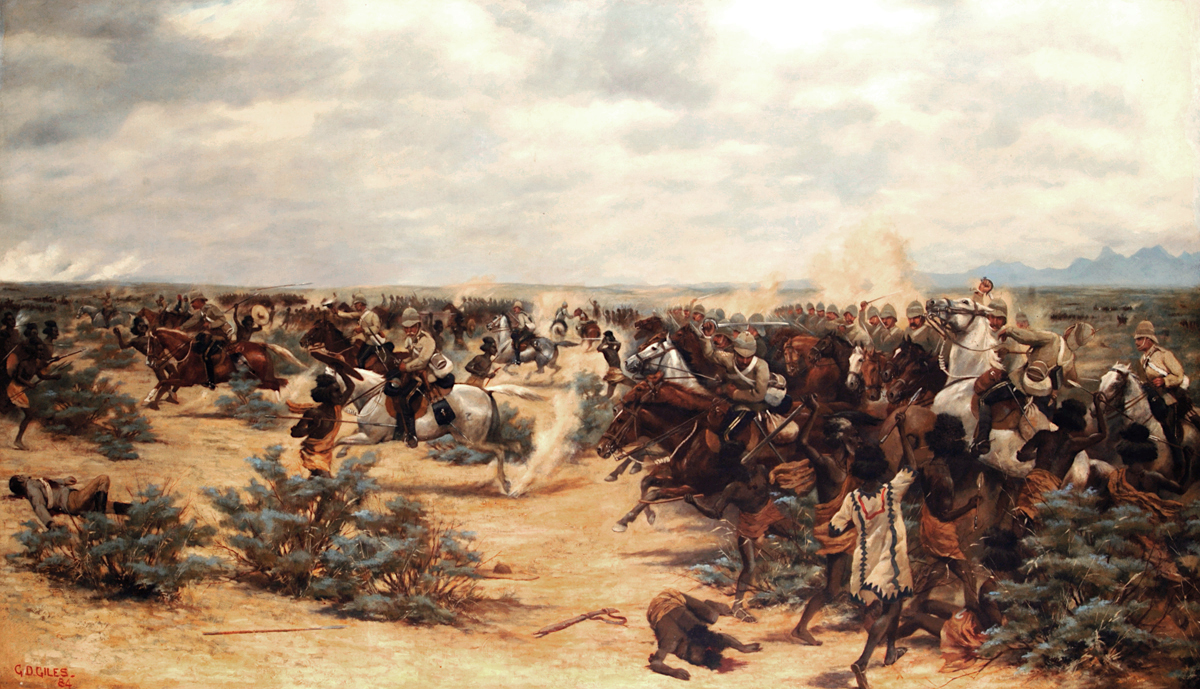
Second battle of El Teb (Godfrey Douglas Giles)

== Aftermath ==
Upon Graham's return to Britain, he received the thanks of parliament and was made a Lieutenant General for distinguished service in the field.

Captain Littledale had a narrow escape in a hand to hand conflict with an Arab, but no officers were killed. The Arab had been armed with a knife and Littledale with a pistol that had jammed. The fight went to the ground, but Littledale was rescued by Corporal Henry Baxter, who saw the struggle and was able to disarm the Arab, bayonet him and carry Littledale to safety and later rejoin the battle. Littledale survived even though he had been stabbed several times and was covered in serious bite marks.

Quartermaster Sergeant William Marshall, 19th Hussars was also decorated with the Victoria Cross by the Queen in Windsor on 3 July 1884, for conspicuous bravery during the cavalry charge at El Teb on 29 February, in bringing Lieutenant Colonel Barrow, 19th Hussars, out of action severely wounded. Both Quartermaster Sergeant Marshall & Sergeant Henry Phipps, 19th Hussars were mentioned in dispatches in the London Gazette of 6 May 1884, Sergeant Phipps was credited with remaining with his troops after twice being wounded and saving the life of Corporal Cramp, 10th Hussars. Sergeant Phipps was among those awarded the Distinguished Conduct Medal by Queen Victoria at Windsor on July 3, 1884.

Because of the heroism of the lower ranks who did have many casualties, the Distinguished Conduct Medal was dispatched to the following on 3 July by Queen Victoria herself at Windsor: Colour-Sergeant Charles Wake, Colour-Sergeant Hayward, Sergeant Henry Phipps, 19th Hussars, Frank Webb, Lance-Sergeant John Doyle, Lance-Sergeant Henry Haycock, Lance-Sergeant Henry James, Corporal Henry Baxter, Corporal David Dossett.

The battle was part of the escalation of the conflict in the Sudan, a conflict which led Herbert Kitchener's reconquest of Sudan in 1898, involving 25,800 men, 8,600 of whom were British, including Winston Churchill.

== Bibliography ==
- Archer, Thomas. The war in Egypt and the Soudan. An episode in the history of the British Empire. 4 Volumes. Blackie & Son, London 1885–1887 (Available at the Cornell University website: Volume 1, Volume 2, Volume 3, Volume 4)
