= Battle of Tamai =

Battle of the Mahdist War

Coordinates: 18.9500°N 37.1833°E

- Part of the Mahdist War, 1881–1899
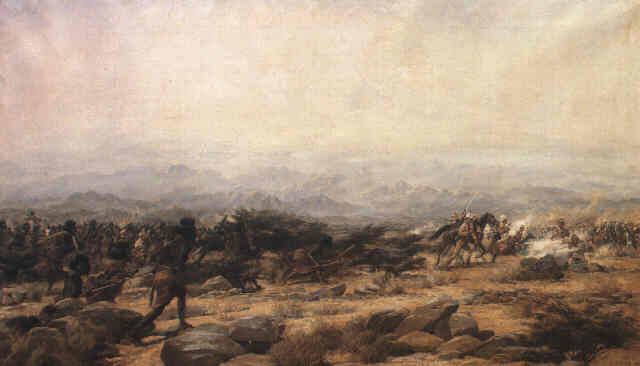
- An incident at the Battle of Tamai, eastern Sudan, 13th March, 1884 by Godfrey Douglas Giles
Date	13 March 1884
Location	Tamai, near Suakin, Eastern Sudan
Result	British victory

Belligerents
United Kingdom	Mahdist Sudan

Commanders and leaders
Sir Gerald Graham	Osman Digna

Strength
4,500 troops 22 field guns 6 machine-guns	10,000 troops

Casualties and losses
111 killed, 111 wounded	2,000 killed, unknown wounded

The Battle of Tamai (or Tamanieh) took place on 13 March 1884 between a British force under Sir Gerald Graham and a Mahdist Sudanese army led by Osman Digna.

Despite his earlier victory at El Teb, Graham realised that Osman Digna's force was far from broken and that he still enjoyed support among the local population. Accordingly, a second expedition departed from Suakin on 10 March in order to defeat the Mahdists definitively.

The force was composed of the same units that had fought at El Teb: 4,500 men, with 22 guns and 6 machine guns. The Mahdists had roughly 10,000 men, most of them belonging to Osman Digna's Hadendoa tribe (known to British soldiers as "Fuzzy Wuzzies" for their unique hair).

== Forces ==
The British forces involved in the battle were:

- Squadron from 10th Hussars
- Squadron from 19th Hussars
- 1st Battalion, The Black Watch (Royal Highlanders)
- 3rd Battalion, The King's Royal Rifle Corps
- 1st Battalion, York and Lancaster Regiment
- 1st Battalion, Gordon Highlanders
- 2nd Battalion, The Royal Irish Fusiliers
- Royal Marines Light Infantry
- Royal Navy Naval Brigade
- 6/1 Scottish Division Royal Artillery
- M/1 Royal Artillery

== Battle ==
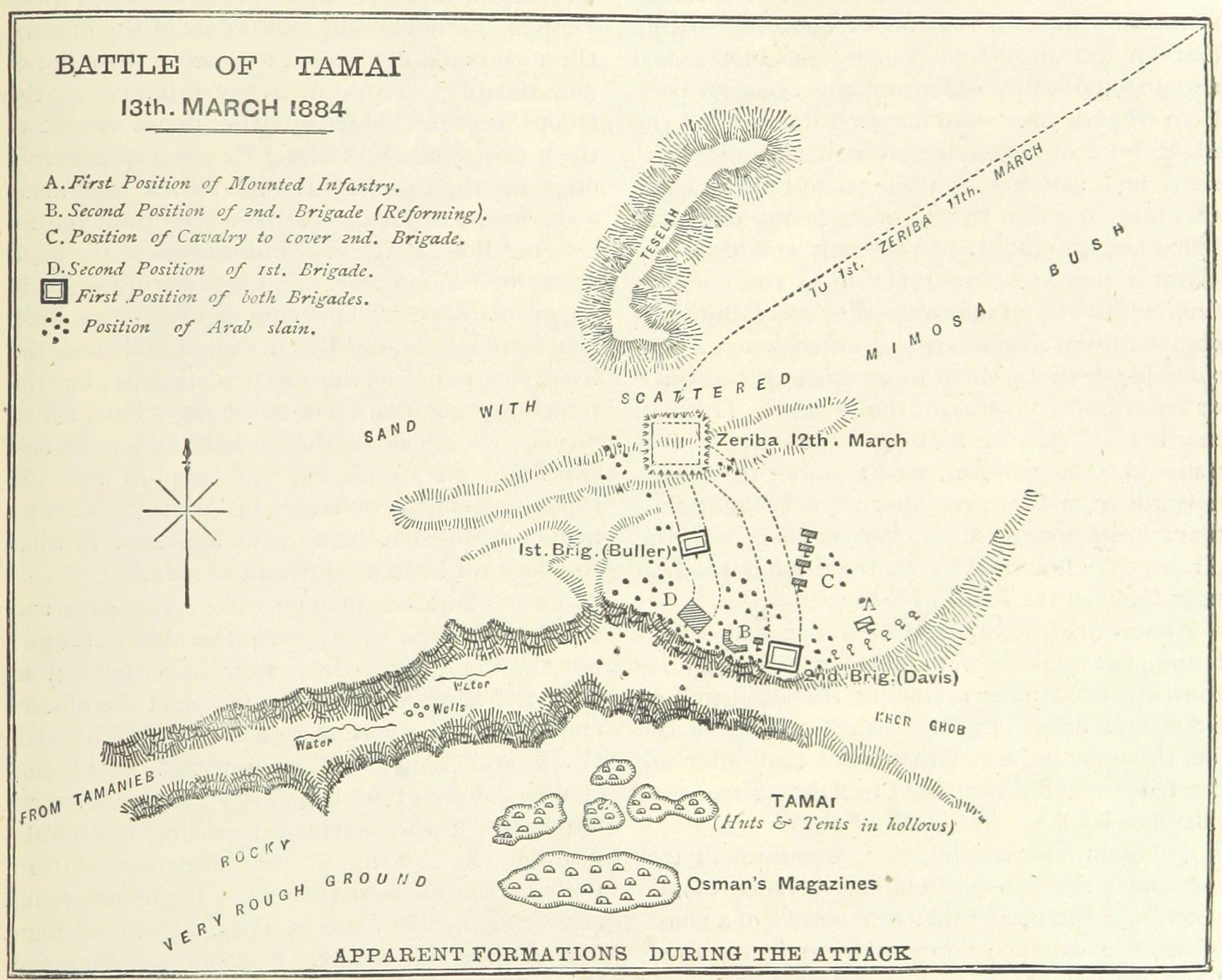
A British map of the battle

On the night of 12 March the British formed an encampment, not far from Osman Digna's positions. From around 1:00 until dawn, Mahdist riflemen approached the camp and opened fire, but their shooting was imprecise, and they inflicted few casualties.

At dawn, the artillery was brought to bear against the Mahdist skirmishers and they were driven back. The infantry (which included the Black Watch) then formed into two infantry squares each of brigade-size and advanced. One square was commanded by Colonel Davis, with General Graham, and the other by Colonel Buller. A scouting party discovered that the main body of the Mahdist force was hidden in a nearby ravine, whereupon General Graham ordered the Black Watch to charge to clear those Mahdists out, leaving a wide gap where they had been stationed in the square. A sudden onslaught of Mahdists rushed into this gap.

The Black Watch found themselves under intense attack from the Sudanese. The square was flooded with a rush of tribesmen and a brutal hand-to-hand combat began. The Black Watch eventually won the fight, driving the Sudanese out, and reforming their square.

Finding themselves in danger of being cut off, the British units fell back in disarray but were quickly reformed in good order. The Mahdist advance was halted by volleys from the other (Buller's) square, which had survived the attack, and by dismounted cavalry units that had not been engaged until then. The concentrated flanking fire inflicted huge casualties among the Mahdists, who were forced to retreat.

The British units then reformed, and resumed their advance, driving the shaken Mahdists out of the ravine and inflicting more casualties on them as they fled. Osman Digna's camp was captured later that day, but Digna himself escaped.

== Aftermath ==
During this battle, the British suffered more losses than in any other battle of the Mahdist war, 214 soldiers being wounded or killed, ten of whom were officers (Churchill gives 208 men, 13 officers). The Mahdists also suffered heavily, losing 4,000 men, or according to Harbottle, 2,000.

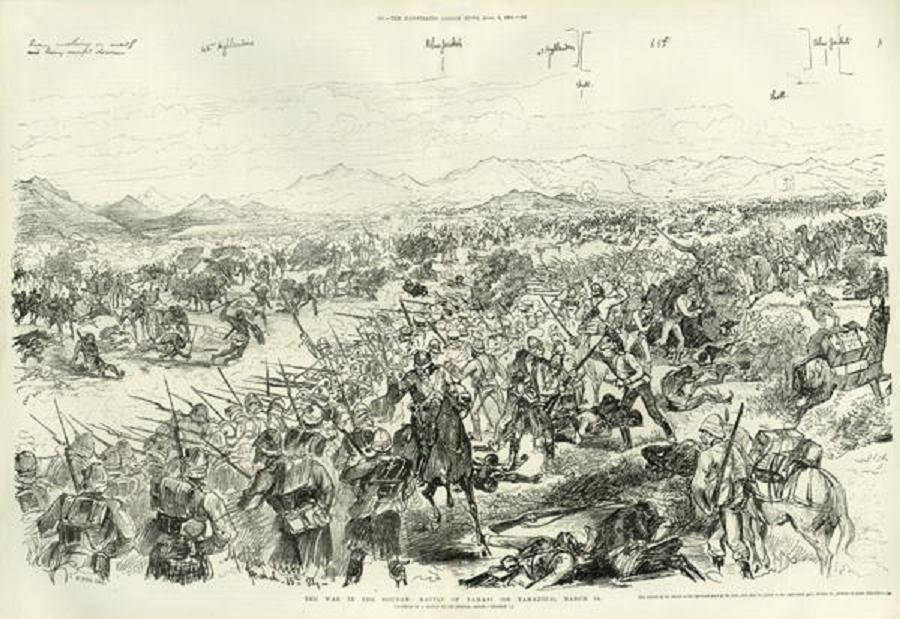
Battle of Tamai

For their conspicuous bravery during the battle, Private Thomas Edwards of the Black Watch and Lieutenant Percival Marling of the King's Royal Rifle Corps were awarded the Victoria Cross, the highest decoration in the British Army.

The British hoped that this defeat would deal a great blow to Osman Digna's prestige as well as weakening his forces, and that he would lose his hold over the Hadendoa. However this was not the case, and when later that year, Graham's force was withdrawn from Sudan, he gradually recovered his influence. Therefore, Graham's campaign came to be seen purely as a punitive exercise against the Sudanese to restore British military pride.

Winston Churchill, who later participated in the Mahdist war, was critical of the British Government's attitude in Eastern Sudan:

"The slaughter [Baker's defeat at El Teb] was complete. The British Government resolved to add to it. The garrisons they had refused to rescue they now determined to avenge."

"But as they [Graham's force] fought without reason, they conquered without profit."

It has been suggested that the objective of British operations in that sector was to avert a possible peril to navigation in the Red Sea. If the Mahdists had taken control of the whole of the Sudanese coast, they might have threatened ships travelling to India, thus endangering the British Empire.
