= Osman Digna =

Sudanese Ansar military commander (1836–1926)

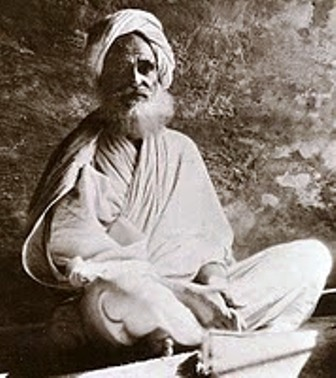
- Osman Digna in old age
- Born: c. 1840; Suakin
- Died: 1926
- Military career
- Allegiance: Mahdist State
- Service years: 1883–1899
- Rank: Emir
- Conflicts: Mahdist War; Battles of El Teb; Battle of Tamai; Battle of Kufit; Battle of Suakin; Battle of Atbara; Battle of Umm Diwaykarat

Osman Digna (Arabic: عثمان دقنة) (c. 1840–1926) was a follower of Muhammad Ahmad, the self-proclaimed Mahdi, in Sudan, who became his best known military commander during the Mahdist War. He was claimed to be a descendant from the Abbasid family. As the Mahdi's ablest general, he played an important role in the fate of General Charles George Gordon and the end of Turkish-Egyptian rule in Sudan.

In Britain, Osman Digna became a notorious figure, both demonised as a savage and respected as a warrior. Winston Churchill described him as an "astute" and "prudent" man, calling him "the celebrated, and perhaps immortal, Osman Digna."

== Mahdist leader ==
Osman Digna's father was a Kurd and his mother hailed from the Hadendoa tribe of the Beja people. His birthplace is not documented, but Suakin was said to be the town where he was born. He was originally known as Osman Ali. He lived in Alexandria, Egypt, where he dealt in the selling of slaves. After the English forced him to quit this business, he took part in the revolt of Ahmed 'Urabi. After the failure of the revolt at the Battle of Tel al-Kebir (13 September 1882), he attached himself to the cause of the Mahdi in Sudan.

About this time he received the name "Digna" because of the fullness of his beard ("the bearded one," from dikn, "the beard"). He was the leader of a powerful army around Suakin. His first battle was an attempt to capture a Turkish-held fort at Sinkat in 1883. His initial attack was repulsed, but the fort eventually fell after a siege.

At the First Battle of El Teb he inflicted a severe defeat on a much larger Egyptian force led by Baker Pasha near Tokar, on 4 February 1884. Immediately after this victory, however, a new British-Egyptian force was sent to retrieve the situation, and he was defeated by General Graham near Tokar at the Second Battle of El Teb.

Both sides withdrew to restore their forces, but Graham soon launched a second attack designed to crush Osman Digna completely. At the Battle of Tamai, the Mahdist forces exploited a gap in the British position, and succeeded in breaking an infantry square. They were almost able to cut off parts of the British force, but the British were able to rally and consolidate their position. The Mahdists were subjected to intense flanking fire and were finally defeated. Despite his defeat, as the only foreign commander who broke the British infantry square, Osman Digna and his troops acquired a reputation amongst the British for immense fighting-prowess. The prowess of his troops is celebrated in Rudyard Kipling's poem "Fuzzy-Wuzzy". He is also named in The Battle of El-Teb, a poem by William McGonagall.

The defeats did not, however, destroy the Mahdists, and Osman Digna remaining in control of his supporters. Graham later withdrew, and Osman Digna restored his army. He presented the battle as a victory, saying that the British had fled "in fear". He wrote to the Mahdi claiming that he had inflicted 8,000 casualties on the British, with only 2,000 of his own troops killed. Official British losses were 100 killed. Nevertheless, the British campaign had achieved very little, as Osman Digna "retained both Sinkat and Tokar and the Suakin-Berber route was controlled by the Ansar [Mahdists]".

The situation led to the increasing isolation of General Gordon, who was under siege in Khartoum. Gordon finally was unable to withdraw to Egypt, and British troops were not quickly sent to relieve him. After the fall of Khartoum to the Mahdists and the death of Gordon, Osman is said to have been given Gordon's watch and sword to show to the Mahdists at Suakin as proof of the victory.

== Later operations ==
Osman Digna later served under the Mahdi's successor Abdallahi ibn Muhammad (known as the Khalifa), who launched a series of military operations in subsequent years. Osman Digna took command of a Mahdist force invading Ethiopia in 1885, but was defeated by Ethiopian general Ras Alula at the Battle of Kufit on 23 September.

In December, 1888, he fought at the Battle of Suakin, attempting to capture the local water forts. He suffered a bloody reverse at the hands of General Grenfell, and was wounded at the arm. Until 1891, Osman Digna continued to direct Mahdist forces in eastern Sudan, fending off Egyptian forces. In February 1891, a combined British-Egyptian force captured Tokar. Local tribes defected from the Mahdists, forcing Osman Digna to retreat to the mountains.

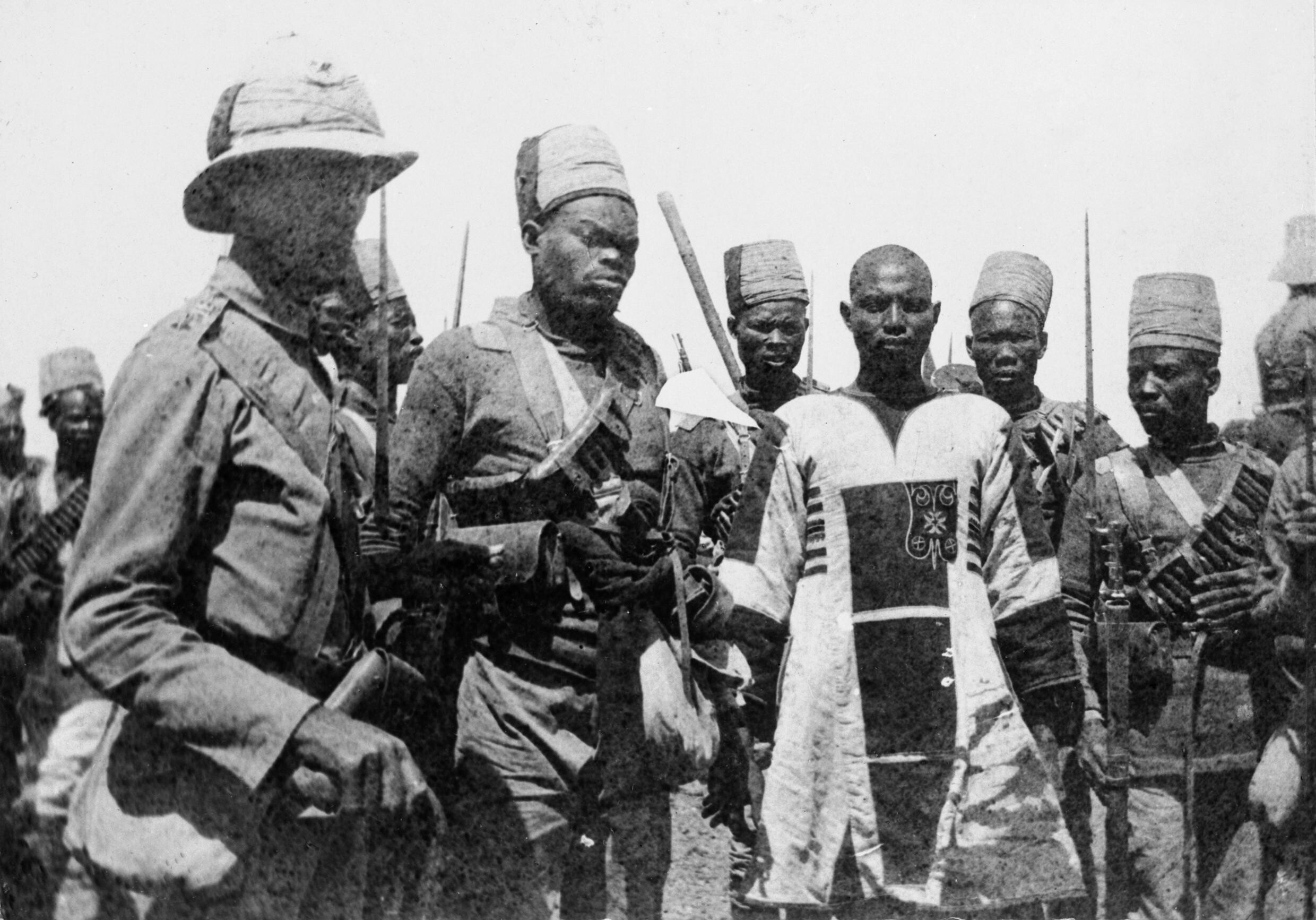
Emir Mahmoud, a Mahdist leader, as prisoner after the Battle of Atbara, photograph by Francis Gregson, 1898

After this, he remained a leader in the Mahdist army, but was only marginally involved in the conflicts that led to the final defeat and death of the Khalifa. When the British under Herbert Kitchener moved into the Sudan in 1898, the Khalifa sent a force under Emir Mahmud Ahmad to join with Osman's army. Osman's plan to outflank Kitchener by moving up to Atbara was approved by the Khalifa, but Mahmud overruled Osman, when he proposed to move their forces even further upriver to Adaramra, threatening Kitchener's line of communications. Instead Mahmoud created a fortified defensive camp at Atbara. This became a sitting target for Kitchener. At the ensuing Battle of Atbara, he launched a barrage followed by a rapid attack. The Mahdist position collapsed. Osman managed to lead a few thousand warriors on a retreat to the south, and most of the remainder were killed or captured, including Mahmud, who was captured by Sudanese troops of the Egyptian Brigade.

In 1899 Osman Digna fought in the last campaign of the Mahdist forces, whose strength had been broken in the previous year at Omdurman. At the Battle of Umm Diwaykarat he was injured, but was the only leader who escaped and continued the resistance. He tried to reach safety in the Hejaz, but on 19 January 1900, he was captured near Tokar and sent as a prisoner to Rosetta. There, he served in prison for eight years, and after his release stayed in Egypt until he died in 1926.

== See also ==
- Muhammad Ahmad
- Beja people
- Sudan
- Egypt
