= Tokar, Sudan =

Tokar طوكر
- Town
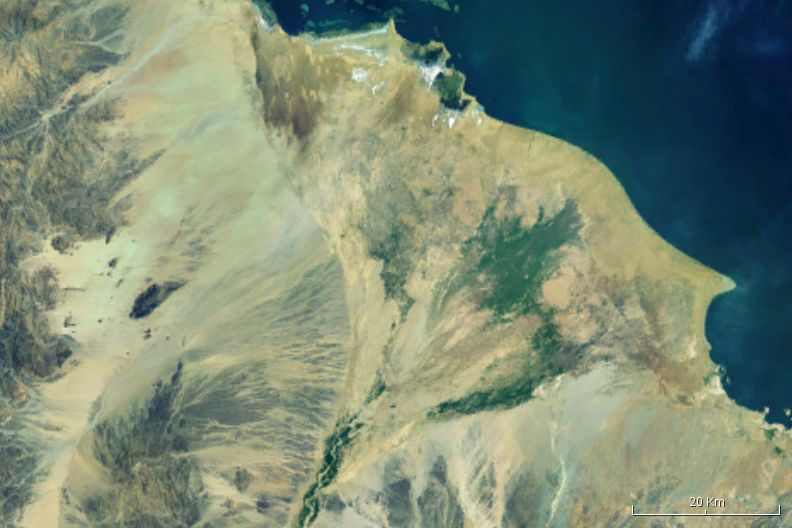
- Views over Tokar

- Location in Sudan
- Coordinates: 18°25′31″N 37°43′45″E
- Country: Sudan
- State: Red Sea
- Elevation: 66 ft (20 m)

Population (2008)
  - Total: 37,051
- Time zone: UTC+02:00 (CAT)

Tokar (Arabic: طوكر), also transliterated Tawkar, is a town of 40,000 people near the Red Sea in northeastern Sudan. Tokar Game Reserve lies to the east of the town.

The town lies in the delta of the Baraka River. Since the 1860s, cotton has been grown in the delta.

== History ==
The Battle of Tokar took place in February 24, 1891. The battle was marked the first occasion that Egypt, with British assistance, defeated the forces of the Mahdi during the Mahdist war.

== Climate ==
Tokar has a hot desert climate (Köppen BWh): of 2981 locations in the whole world only 48 are warmer than Tokar, and 166 drier. The high temperature mean daily value in July averages 43 °C or 109.4 °F, the low temperature daily mean does not go under 28 °C or 82.4 °F. In January the high temperature averages 28 °C or 82.4 °F and the low temperature mean is 20 °C or 68 °F. Rain is scarce year-round but most likely to occur between November and January.

Climate data for Tokar
Month	Jan	Feb	Mar	Apr	May	Jun	Jul	Aug	Sep	Oct	Nov	Dec	Year
Mean daily maximum °C (°F)	28.2 (82.8)	28.7 (83.7)	30.9 (87.6)	33.7 (92.7)	37.7 (99.9)	42.3 (108.1)	42.9 (109.2)	42.4 (108.3)	41.3 (106.3)	36.8 (98.2)	33.1 (91.6)	29.8 (85.6)	35.7 (96.2)
Daily mean °C (°F)	24.4 (75.9)	24.4 (75.9)	26.1 (79.0)	27.8 (82.0)	31.1 (88.0)	33.3 (91.9)	35.0 (95.0)	35.0 (95.0)	33.3 (91.9)	30.6 (87.1)	27.8 (82.0)	25.6 (78.1)	29.5 (85.2)
Mean daily minimum °C (°F)	20.0 (68.0)	19.7 (67.5)	20.9 (69.6)	22.0 (71.6)	23.1 (73.6)	25.1 (77.2)	28.0 (82.4)	28.3 (82.9)	26.2 (79.2)	25.3 (77.5)	23.6 (74.5)	21.2 (70.2)	23.6 (74.5)
Average rainfall mm (inches)	17 (0.7)	4 (0.2)	1 (0.0)	2 (0.1)	2 (0.1)	1 (0.0)	5 (0.2)	4 (0.2)	1 (0.0)	7 (0.3)	22 (0.9)	16 (0.6)	82 (3.3)
Average relative humidity (%)	69	66	64	59	50	37	34	36	42	58	63	67	54
Mean daily sunshine hours	7.0	5.1	6.7	8.8	9.2	6.5	4.9	7.1	8.3	8.7	6.8	5.3	6.8
Source: Arab Meteorology Book
