= Ali Wad Hilu =

Sudanese Ansar military leader (died 1899)

- Died: 25 November 1899 Kordofan, Mahdist Sudan
- Service years: 1881–1899
- Rank: Khalifa
- Conflicts: Mahdist War; Siege of Khartoum; Battle of Omdurman; Battle of Umm Diwaykarat †

Ali Wad Hilu (died 25 November 1899) was one of the three Kalifas, or deputies, of Muhammad Ahmad (1844–1885), who styled himself the Mahdi, the others being Muhammad Sharif and 'Abd Allah ibn Muhammad.

Ali Wad Hilu's followers included the Dighaym, Kianan and al-Lahiwiyin Baqqara Arabs from the Gezira region, which lies between the Blue Nile and the White Nile. He joined the Mahdi in 1881, and his warriors were the first of the Baqqara to join the cause. His forces participated in the sack of Khartoum in January 1885 in which General Gordon was killed, and which established the Mahdi's control over the Sudan. When the British re-invaded Sudan, at the Battle of Omdurman (2 September 1898) he led a force of 5,000 fighting under his green flag.

For the next year he remained loyal to the Khalifa 'Abd Allah as he wandered in the regions of the White Nile, Nuba Mountains and Kordofan. Ali Wad Hilu was killed at the Battle of Umm Dibaikarat (25 November 1899), where the Khalifa 'Abd Allah and other Mahdist leaders were also killed.
