= Jibba =

Coat worn by Mahdists in Sudan, 1880s

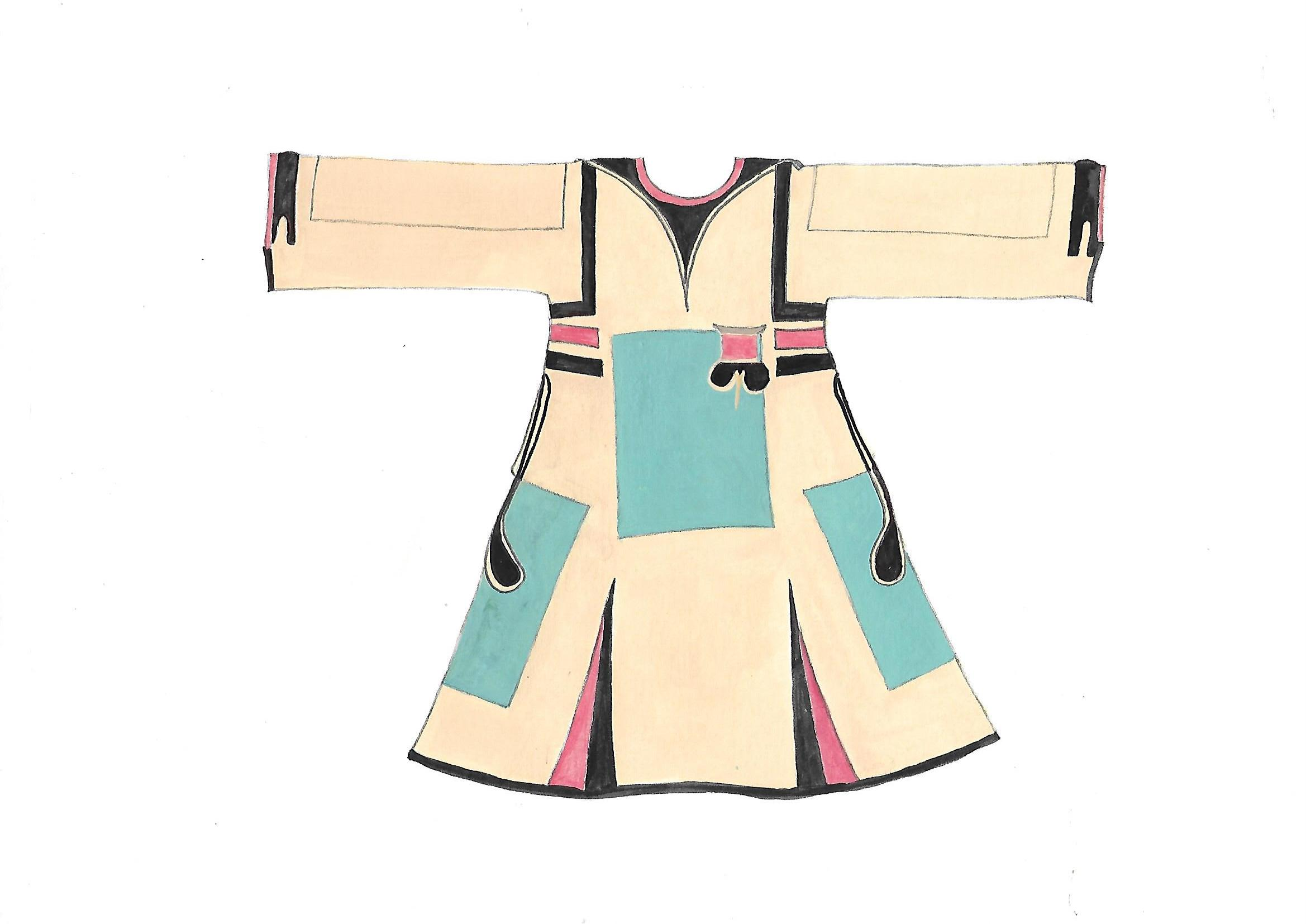
Watercolour of a Mahdist jibba held at the British Museum

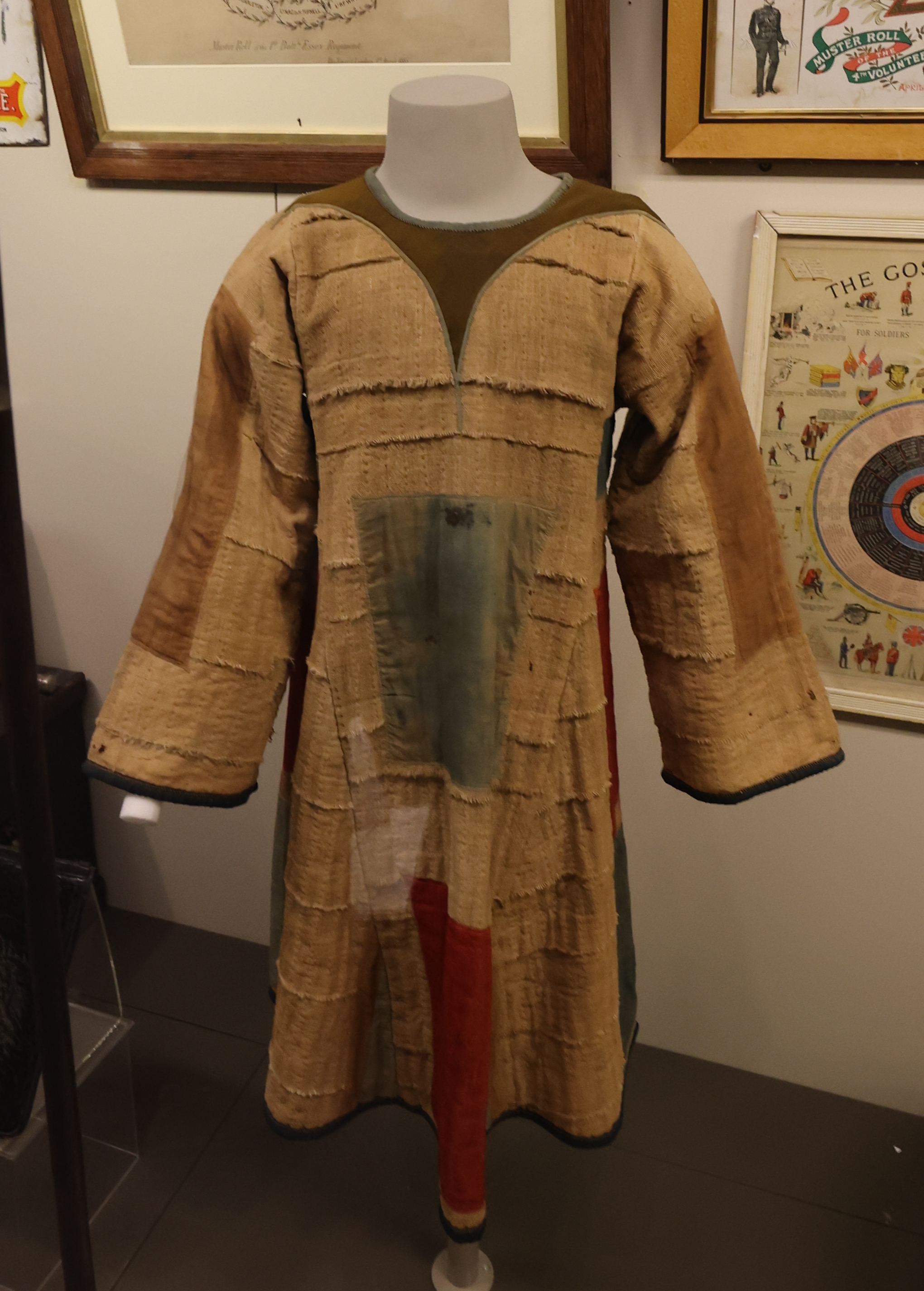
Late 19th century Jibba in the collection of the Essex regiment museum

The jibba or jibbah (Arabic: جُبَّة, romanized: jubbā), originally referring to an outer garment, cloak or coat, is a long coat worn by Muslim men. During the Mahdist State in Sudan at the end of the 19th century, it was the garment worn by the followers of the Mahdī (Anṣār, 'helpers'). Muhammad Ahmad proclaimed himself al-Mahdī al-Muntaẓar (the Expected Rightly-guided One), successor of the Islamic prophet Muhammad, in 1881. He exhorted his followers to join a jihad against Turco-Egyptian Sudan.

The Mahdī decreed that all his followers should wear the patched jibba, a version of the muraqqa’a worn by Sufi mendicants, which symbolises the wearer's commitment to a religious way of life. The ascetic symbolism of the patched garment was appropriate to the Mahdist aim to restore strict Islamic standards to Sudan, which they felt had been corrupted by the appointment of European and American Christians into positions of power by the Ottoman-Egyptian government.

== Etymology ==
In Arabic, ǧubba means 'long woollen garment, undergarment'. It is derived from the root ج-ب-ب meaning to cut, to open, referring to a robe "cut open" at the front. The Arabic word jubbā is said to be the origin of the Italian word giubba and the French jupe, both referring to a type of skirt. In modern English, jupes is a chiefly Scottish expression for a man's coat, jacket, or tunic. In the late 13th century, it referred to a man's loose jacket and had been introduced from Old French jupe, which had meant a "tunic worn under the armor."

== Background ==
=== Sufism ===
Referring to the traditional woollen (Arabic: sūf for wool) coat jubbah, the 9th-century Sufi mystic Al-Ḥallāj has been quoted among others by the scholar Annemarie Schimmel for saying in Arabic: ما في الجبة إلا الله. As she commented, "His famous utterance 'There is nothing beneath the cloak but God' expressed his consciousness of total annihilation in God."

The patched jibba worn by the Anṣār in battle was a version of the muraqqa’a (patchwork), a garment worn by Sufi mendicants. Despite its ragged appearance, donning such a garment was an honour earned only after a Sufi initiate completed three years of learning and discipline. They were often made and given to Sufi novices by their masters, once they were considered ready to accept a life of asceticism. As this garment tore and became worn, it would be mended with patches, rather than being replaced. Muhammad Ahmad was given a patched garment upon completion of his Sufi novitiate in 1868. After he proclaimed himself the Mahdi in 1881, he decreed that all Anṣār should wear a similar garment.

=== Adaptation ===
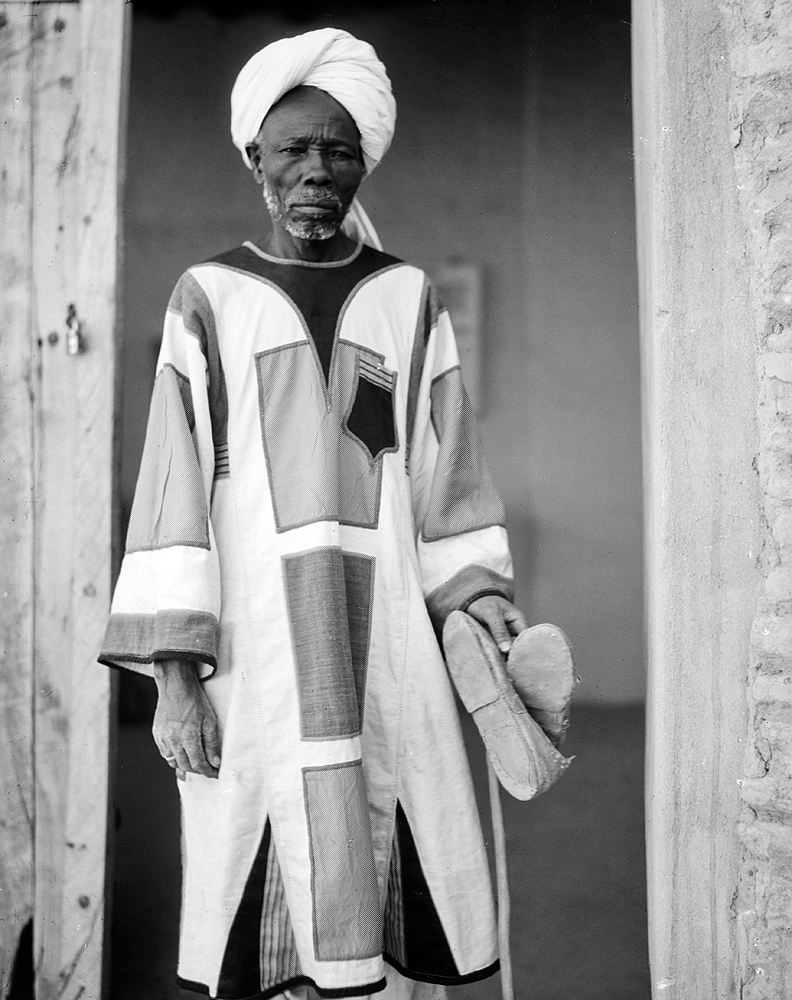
The caretaker of the Khalifa's house in Omdurman, wearing a jibba of the type formerly worn by leaders of the Mahdist Army. 1936.

The Mahdist creed had two main tenets: rejection of worldliness and dedication to the jihad (holy war) declared by the Mahdī. These two values are reflected in the design of the jibba. The patches symbolised both a dedication to a religious way of life and, as the war progressed, came to denote the military rank and division of the wearer. The rule that all followers of the Mahdī should wear the jibba had the advantage of removing traditional visual markers which differentiated potentially fractious tribes, thus enforcing unity and cohesion amongst his forces.

The design of the jibba became militarised in various ways. In comparison to the asymmetric and ragged muraqqa’a, the Mahdist jibba became increasingly stylised and symmetrical. Two types of jibba emerged: the jibba worn by the Mahdist rank and file were simple in design with patches usually limited to red and blue. The jibba worn by military leaders were generally more detailed, stylised and brightly coloured. These were often decorated with a scrolled patch/pocket on the chest and embroidery to accentuate the neckline of the garment. The bright colours and detailed design of these garments meant that they were more clearly visible during battle.

After the fall of the Mahdiyya, jibba of the style worn by Mahdist leaders in battle were worn generally by Mahdists on formal occasions. The caretaker of the Khalifa's House Museum in Omdurman was photographed wearing one of these jibba in 1936.

== Production and different styles ==
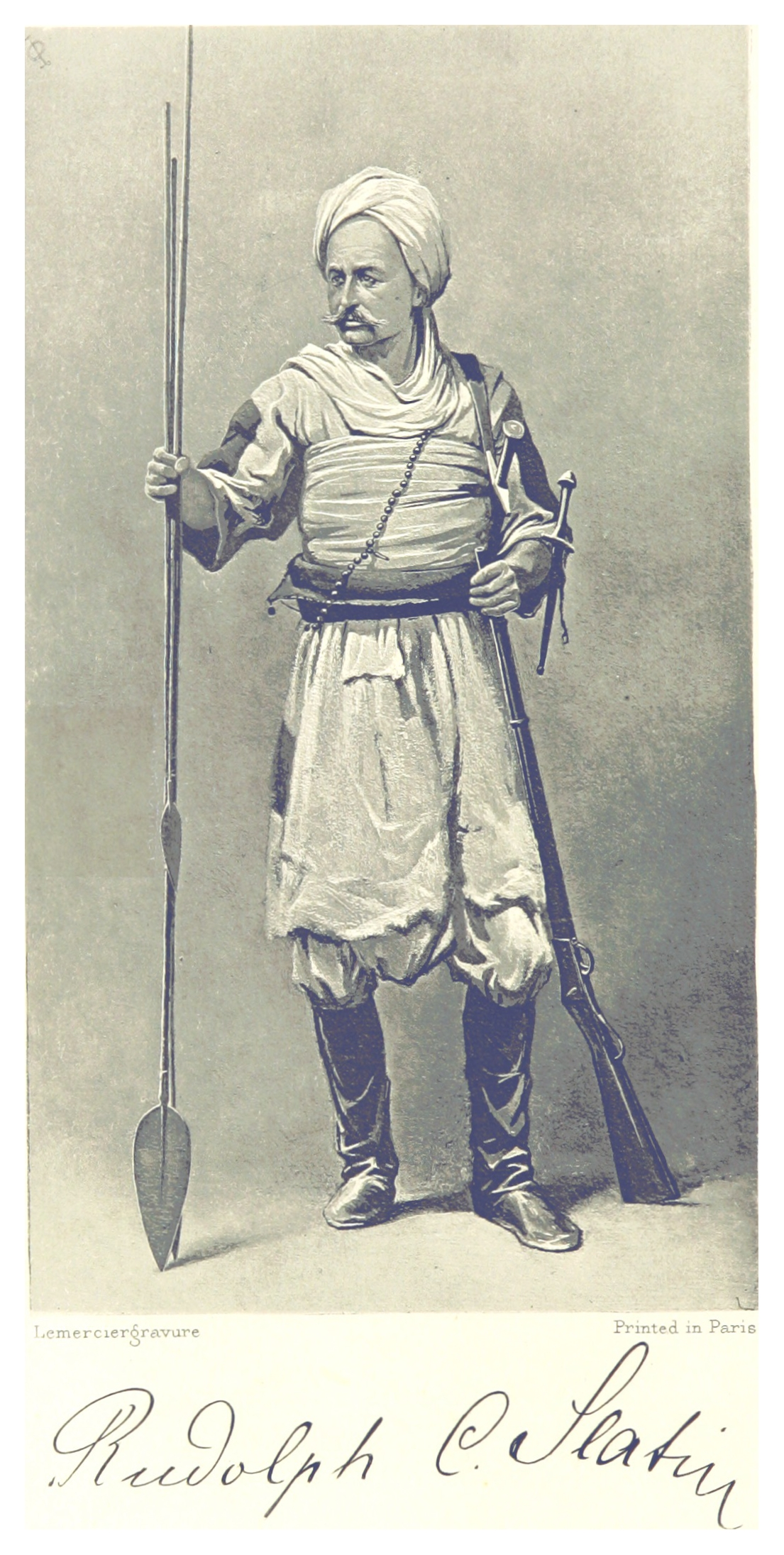
Rudolf Slatin wearing a patched jibba. 1896.

The muraqqa’a worn by Sufis were traditionally made out of wool, from which the Sufi derive their name, suf being the Arabic word for wool. However, the jibba worn by the Mahdi's followers were made of a rough cotton called dammur. The production of cotton was carried out almost exclusively by the women of the Mahdiyya. The women spun the thread and wove it into fabric on looms. Next, the fabric was cut and sewn to make the flared skirt and long sleeves of the jibba. Finally, patches were appliquéd onto the garment. The patches were also generally made out of cotton. However, after the Mahdist victory at the Siege of Khartoum, stocks of wool were taken from the city ruins and much of this fabric was used to make and repair patches. Scraps of enemy uniforms salvaged from battlefields were also used to patch the garments. Although the women of the Mahdiyya carried out most of the production, European prisoners were occasionally involved in the making process.

In the collection of the Musée du quai Branly in Paris, there is a jibba with red and black embroidered patches and an inscription under the armpits saying "This tunic should be put on with pride and wisdom."

== Diplomacy ==
As well as having military and religious significance, textiles played a diplomatic, albeit unsuccessful role in the conflicts during the Mahdist War. The Mahdi and the Governor-General of Sudan, Charles George Gordon, sent presents of clothing to one another, hoping to encourage their opponent to stand down. Gordon sent a Turkish fez and a red robe of honour to the Mahdi. However, rather than being appeased, the Mahdi considered the rich textiles to be an insult to his values of asceticism. In return, he sent a 'patch home spun tunic' to Gordon, which was 'the clothing we want for Ourself and Our Companions who desire the world to come'. He hoped that Gordon would don the jibba and convert to Islam.

== Plundered jibbas ==
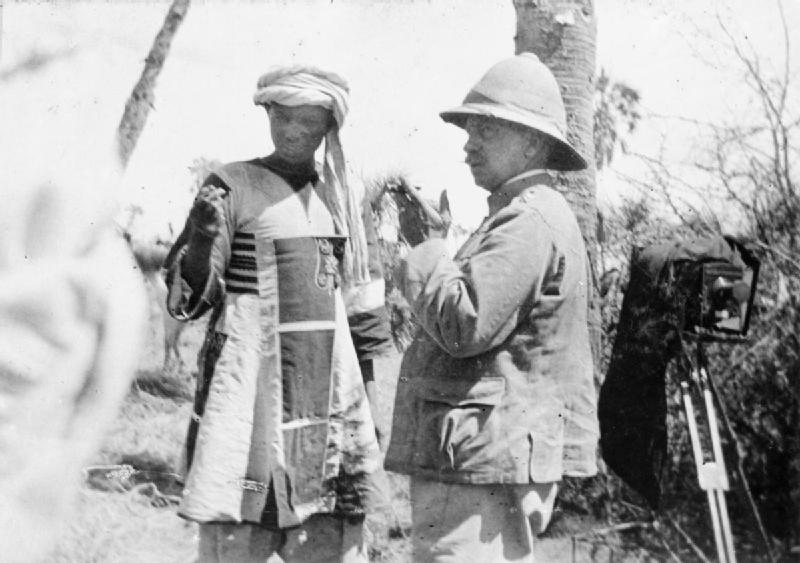
Director of Military Intelligence, Reginald Wingate, interrogating Sudanese prisoner Emir Mahmoud wearing a jibba in 1898, as pictured by war correspondent Francis Gregson

The Mahdist State was established in 1885 after the Siege of Khartoum. The Mahdī died shortly after this victory and was succeeded by the Khalifa Abdulahi. The Mahdiyya state continued under his rule until 1898, when an Anglo-Egyptian force led by Lord Kitchener had a decisive victory against the Mahdist forces at the Battle of Omdurman.

Many jibbas were collected from the battlefields of Anglo-Egyptian victories like Omdurman, 'Aṭbara and Tūshka. They were taken to Britain as war trophies, and many of these are now held in cultural institutions across the UK. Rudolf Carl von Slatin, a former prisoner of the Mahdist forces, was freed in 1895 and was subsequently photographed styled as an Anṣār soldier, wearing a patched jibba, which might have been plundered from a recent battlefield.

== Reception ==
In her illustrated book Regional Folk Costumes of the Sudan, Griselda El Tayib wrote about the different style of jibbas conserved in the Khalifa House Museum in Omdurman: "Also very elaborate and ornamental are some of the padded jibbas worn under chainmail by some Mahdi's emirs and their cavalry men. Two of these, displayed in the Khalifa's Museum, are in the patched Mahdist style. Two others, however, are in very elaborate striped silk – one of them was captured from Wad Al Nijumi, when he was killed on his attempted invasion of Egypt. It is in typical Egyptian blue and white striped silk, known as shahiya, the tea dress. This garment has a curious padded flap hanging down at the back of the neck, lined with dark blue."

From May to August 2021, the Royal Engineers Museum in the UK presented the exhibition Making African Connections: Sudan & the Mahdiyya. This exhibition explored the history of the Madhya period in Sudan by drawing on the museum’s unique collection of Sudanese artefacts, documents and photographs. In Britain, the siege of Khartoum and resulting death of General Charles Gordon of the Royal Engineers are the most famous episodes in this history. However, this exhibition sought to explore the Mahdiyya in a more rounded way: looking at the Ottoman-Egyptian colonisation of Sudan that it ended; at religious and social life under the Mahdiyya; and how it was ended by the British invasion of 1898.
