= Sanin Husain =

Mahdist religious and military leader

- Born: c. 1847; Dar Tama
- Died: January 1909 (aged c. 62); Kabkabiya
- Military career
- Allegiance: Mahdist State
- Service years: 1885–1909
- Rank: Acting governor of western Darfur
- Conflicts: Mahdist War: Nuba Mountains campaign; Mahdist–Ethiopian conflict; Darfur rebellions; War against Ali Dinar

Sanin Husain (c. 1847–1909) (Note: Also known as "Sanin Husayn", "Senin Wad Hussein", "Ali Feki Senin", and "Fekhi Senin") was a religious and military leader who served the Mahdist State. Even after the Mahdists had been completely defeated by Anglo-Egyptian forces in 1899, Sanin refused to surrender and continued to maintain a Mahdist holdout at Kabkabiya in Darfur. From there, he resisted the reestablished Sultanate of Darfur, repeatedly defeating the armies of Sultan Ali Dinar. Sanin Husain was finally killed by Ali Dinar's forces in a siege of Kabkabiya lasting 17 to 18 months.

== Biography ==
=== Early life and military service ===
Sanin Husain was born at Dar Tama, a frontier area between the Wadai Empire and Sultanate of Darfur, around 1847. His family claimed descent from the Banu Khazraj, a renowned Arab clan, through his grandfather who had migrated to Dar Tama as "stranger sharifi". His mother was an ethnic Tama, and researcher Babett Jánszky consequently described Sanin as Sudanese Tama. From an early point, Sanin took an interest in religious matters and gradually garnered respect as an authority on religion in Dar Tama, eventually becoming a local "holy man".

In 1885, religious leader and self-proclaimed Mahdi Muhammad Ahmad overthrew the Turco-Egyptian rule in Sudan and established the Mahdist State. After hearing of Muhammad Ahmad's achievements, Sanin Husain decided to travel with his followers to the Mahdist capital of Omdurman to swear allegiance to Muhammad Ahmad. Upon arriving at Omdurman, Sanin and his companions joined a thousands-strong crowd who were taking part in the Jumu'ah prayers led by Muhammad Ahmad. The Mahdi noticed the group from Dar Tama, and sent a messenger to learn who they were. From his podium, Muhammad Ahmad then singled them out, and prayed the Al-Fatiha to them. Following the prayers, the Mahdi sent another messenger to Sanin, telling him that he and his comrades should join the Mahdist military to fight under Hamdan Abu Anja in the Nuba Mountains. Despite having barely seen the Mahdi and not even talked with him directly, the group was very impressed that he had singled them out in the great crowd. Sanin and his comrades promptly joined the Mahdists and travelled to join a unit led by an emir of Tama origin, Abdel-Rahman, who was already serving under Hamdan Abu Anja.

Sanin consequently ventured to the Nuba Mountains, but word soon reached the Mahdist forces there that Muhammad Ahmad had unexpectedly died. Sanin Husain and Abdel-Rahman were subsequently recalled to Omdurman to pledge allegiance to Khalifa Abdallahi ibn Muhammad, Mahdi Muhammad Ahmad's successor. After an interview with the Khalifa, Sanin's position was confirmed and he was sent back to the Nuba Mountains, where he fought from 1885 to 1887. He then returned to Omdurman for a short time before being dispatched east alongside Abdel-Rahman. They joined an army led by Hamdan Abu Anja which was part of the Mahdist campaign against the Ethiopian Empire. Sanin fought in Ethiopia from 1887 to 1889, returning to Omdurman after Hamdan Abu Anja had died and the Ethiopians been defeated in the Battle of Gallabat.

=== Mahdist official in western Darfur ===
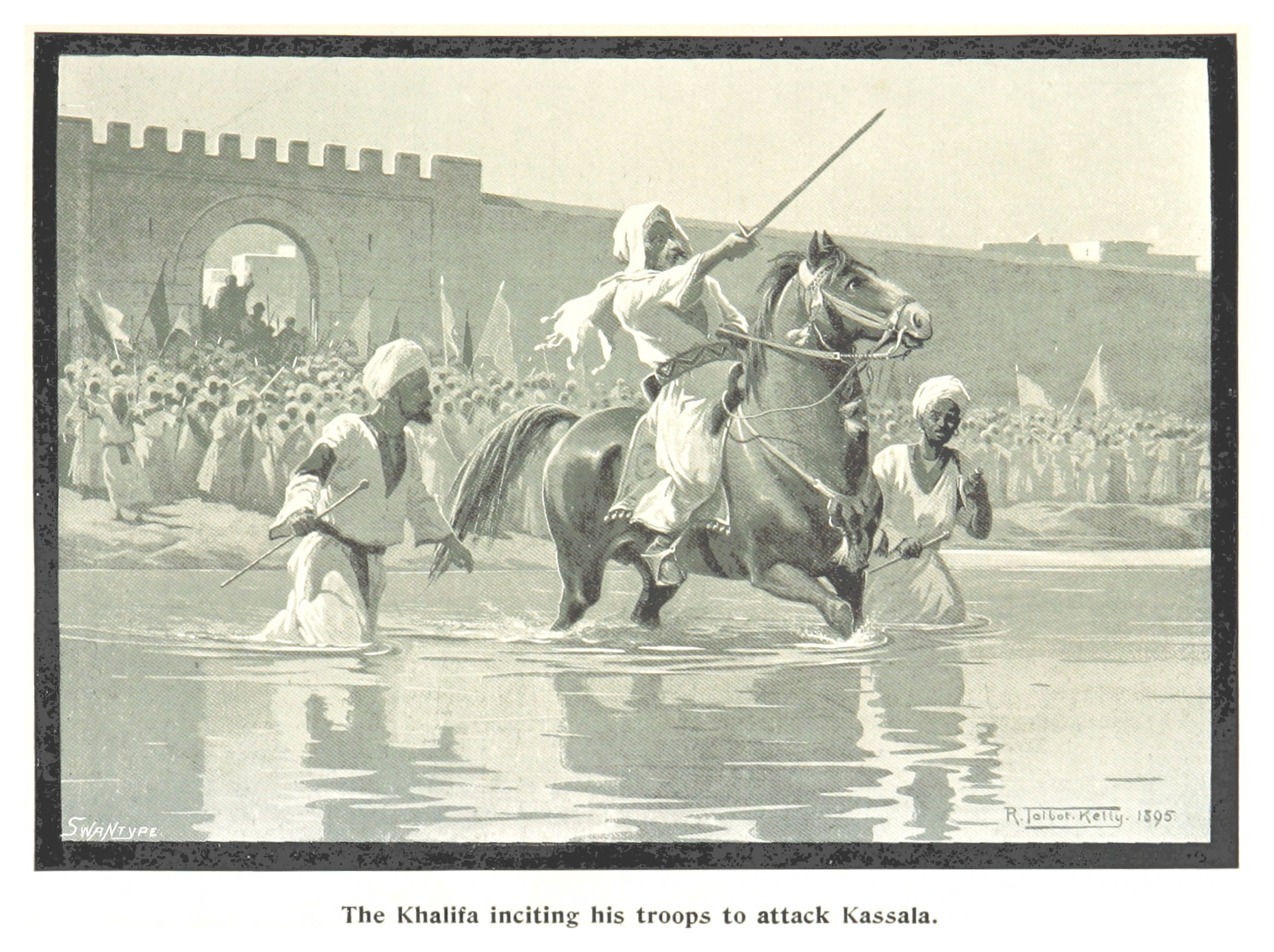
Sanin Husain served as official during the rule of Khalifa Abdallahi ibn Muhammad (pictured).

Following the Ethiopian campaign, Sanin's talent and loyalty as commander were gradually being recognized, and he was chosen to join the force of Abd al-Qadir Dalil that was sent to western Darfur in 1889. Abd al-Qadir Dalil was appointed governor of western Darfur with Kabkabiya as his seat, while Sanin became his assistant. Both served under the command of Osman Adam, the chief governor of Darfur. However, Mahdist rule in Darfur became extremely unstable as the government of Khalifa Abdallahi ibn Muhammad implemented unpopular policies. Several revolts broke out, gradually driving the Mahdists from Darfur. In 1890, Osman Adam was killed in battle, whereupon the sub-governors of Darfur, including Abd al-Qadir Dalil, were recalled to al-Fashir to await the arrival of a new chief governor, Emir Mahmud. Sanin remained behind at Kabkabiya, and was appointed official head of Kabkabiya District in 1891.

In 1895, Emir Mahmud invaded Dar Gimr and Dar Tama, with Sanin acting as his guide and advisor. However, most Mahdist armies stationed in Darfur and the governors were recalled to Omdurman to assist the resistance against the Anglo-Egyptian invasion. Provided with some military equipment and troops by Abd al-Qadir Dalil before his departure, Sanin was left behind and appointed acting governor of western Darfur in 1896. He further bolstered his arsenal by recovering guns left hidden by Osman Adam's old army which had mostly died of starvation and disease in the area close to Kabkabiya. Isolated from the rest of the Mahdist State, Sanin became largely autonomous and very influential within the region. He was still maintaining his base and army by the time the Mahdist State was destroyed by Anglo-Egyptian forces in 1899.

=== Holdout at Kabkabiya ===
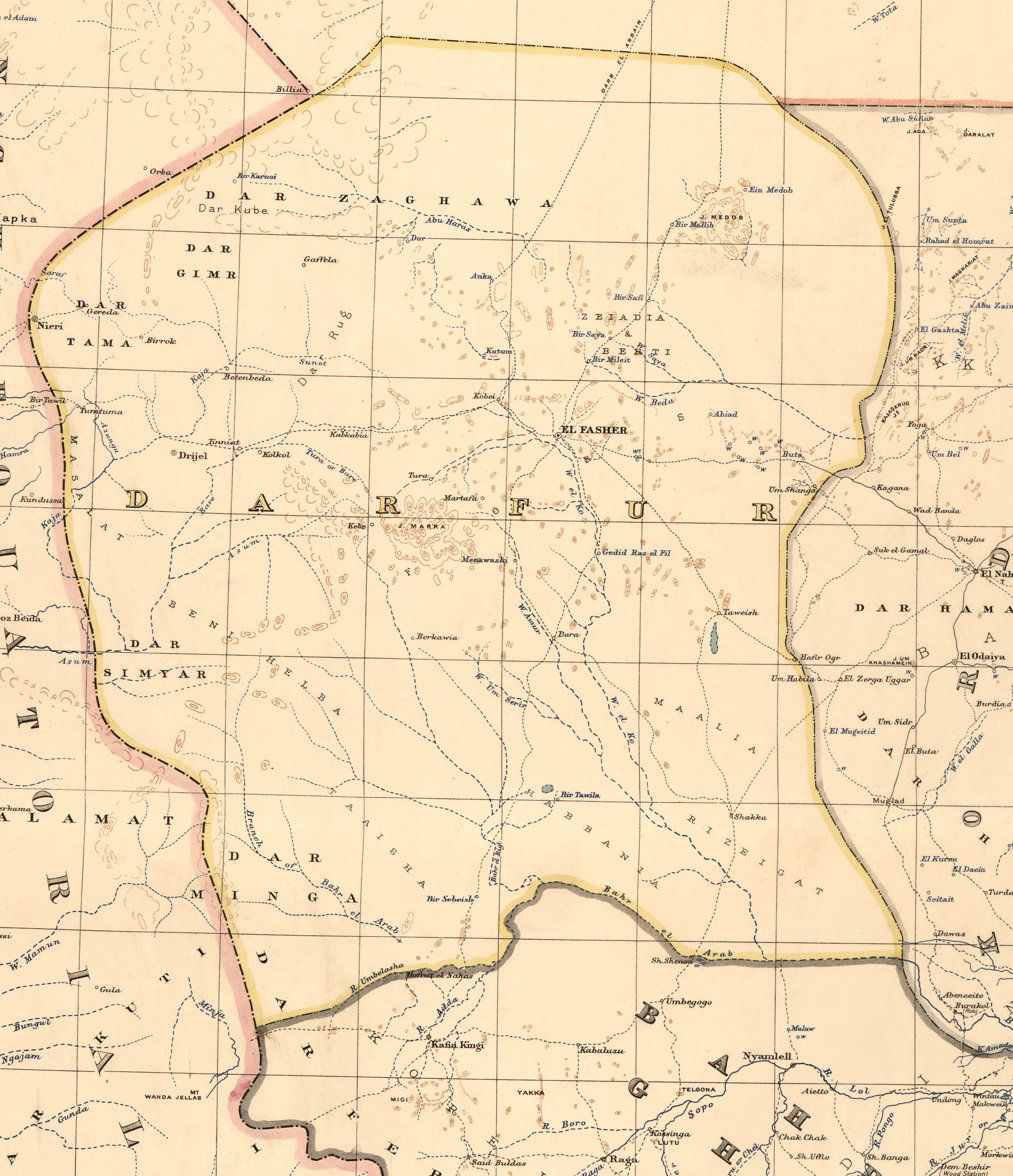
1914 map of Darfur, including Kabkabiya ("Kabkabia").

Despite the death of Khalifa Abdallahi ibn Muhammad, Sanin remained faithful to the Mahdist cause and gathered other loyalists, maintaining a strong military. Many surviving Mahdists from the east travelled to Kabkabiya to join him. His force eventually grew to be about 4,000 strong. Of these, 1,000 were ansar who were religiously motivated, while the rest were more interested in a life as warriors and in gaining plunder. Along with Arabi Dafalla of Dar Taaisha and Sultan Abuker Ismail of Dar Masalit, Sanin was one of three Mahdist commanders who continued to operate in Darfur after the Mahdist government's fall. Meanwhile, Ali Dinar used the power vacuum to reestablish the Sultanate of Darfur under his own leadership. The new Sultan then attempted to take full control of the region, but Sanin refused to submit to him. The two knew each other from a time when Ali Dinar had been a refugee, and disliked each other then. Sanin considered Ali Dinar a traitor, as the latter had once deserted from the Mahdist military. In turn, the Sultan considered the Kabkabiya holdout an obstacle in expanding his influence westwards, while coveting the arms which Sanin had under his control.

Ali Dinar sent several armies numbering thousands of troops against Sanin, but the Kabkabiya leader repeatedly defeated them. He defeated two enemy armies in 1900, and won another victory in 1901. Sanin also had to face several other hostile states and tribes surrounding him, all of whom coveted his weaponry. He successfully repelled their attacks as well. He was aided by the well defendable situation of Kabkabiya which was protected by a series of hills. Despite this, Sanin was factually isolated and the other Mahdist holdouts as well as anti-Ali Dinar groups were gradually destroyed. Sanin's resistance was described by researcher Samuel Bey Atiya as the "last organised Mahdist stand in the Sudan". Despite this, Sanin sent a letter to Khartoum, requesting that he be acknowledged by the new Anglo-Egyptian government as official and provided with help. The Khartoum government had already acknowledged Ali Dinar as their subject, and accordingly did not wish to support Sanin.

In 1902, the ruler of Dar Gimr promised Sultan Ali Dinar his daughter's hand in marriage under the condition that he defeated Sanin Husain. Considering Sanin Husain far too tough for this kind of deal, Ali Dinar opted to instead conquer Dar Gimr and take the ruler's daughter by force. In 1903, Sanin Husain scored two more victories over Ali Dinar's forces. Afterwards, the Sultan refrained from any more large attacks while building up his strength. However, he continued to send out small raiding parties to constantly harass Sanin's forces.

In 1907, Ali Dinar diverted his full attention to Sanin and sent a massive army led by his best generals, Adam Rijal and Mahmud al-Dadingawi, to finally crush the Kabkabiya holdout. Instead of forcing a battle, the Sultanate's army surrounded Kabkabiya and built several fortified camps (zariba). The siege lasted 17 to 18 months, and most of Sanin's starving troops gradually deserted while his ammunition ran out. In January 1909, Ali Dinar's troops finally stormed Sanin's zariba. Only about 400 ansar remained with Sanin, and they made a last stand. Most fought to the death, including Sanin and his lieutenants. Those who were captured alive, including Sanin's son Abdel-Shafi, were branded with an "H" on the face as sign of servitude. The head of the "gallant old man" was presented to Ali Dinar. (Note: G.D. Lampen stated that the final campaign began in 1908 and that Sanin Husain was killed in the same year.) The heads of Sanin and his commanders were sent to "decorate" the market of al-Fashir. The Sultan also sent Sanin's flag to Khartoum as a gift, and ordered the old mosque at Kabkabiya (which had been destroyed by Mahdists) to be rebuilt.

=== Assessment and son's fate ===
Researcher Martin W. Daly described Sanin Husain as Ali Dinar's "most formidable challenger", and Jánszky stated that he remains the most famous Tama leader up to today. Sanin's opponent Mahmud al-Dadingawi would later tell the English about him in a respectful manner, regarding him as talented soldier and "die hard".

Sultan Ali Dinar of Darfur was eventually overthrown and killed during the Anglo-Egyptian Darfur Expedition of 1916. Afterwards, Abdel-Shafi got free and offered his services to the Anglo-Egyptian government, while starting to collect the people and goods which had survived the siege of Kabkabiya, regarding them as his inheritance.
