= Jellabiya =

Loose-fitting, traditional Egyptian garment

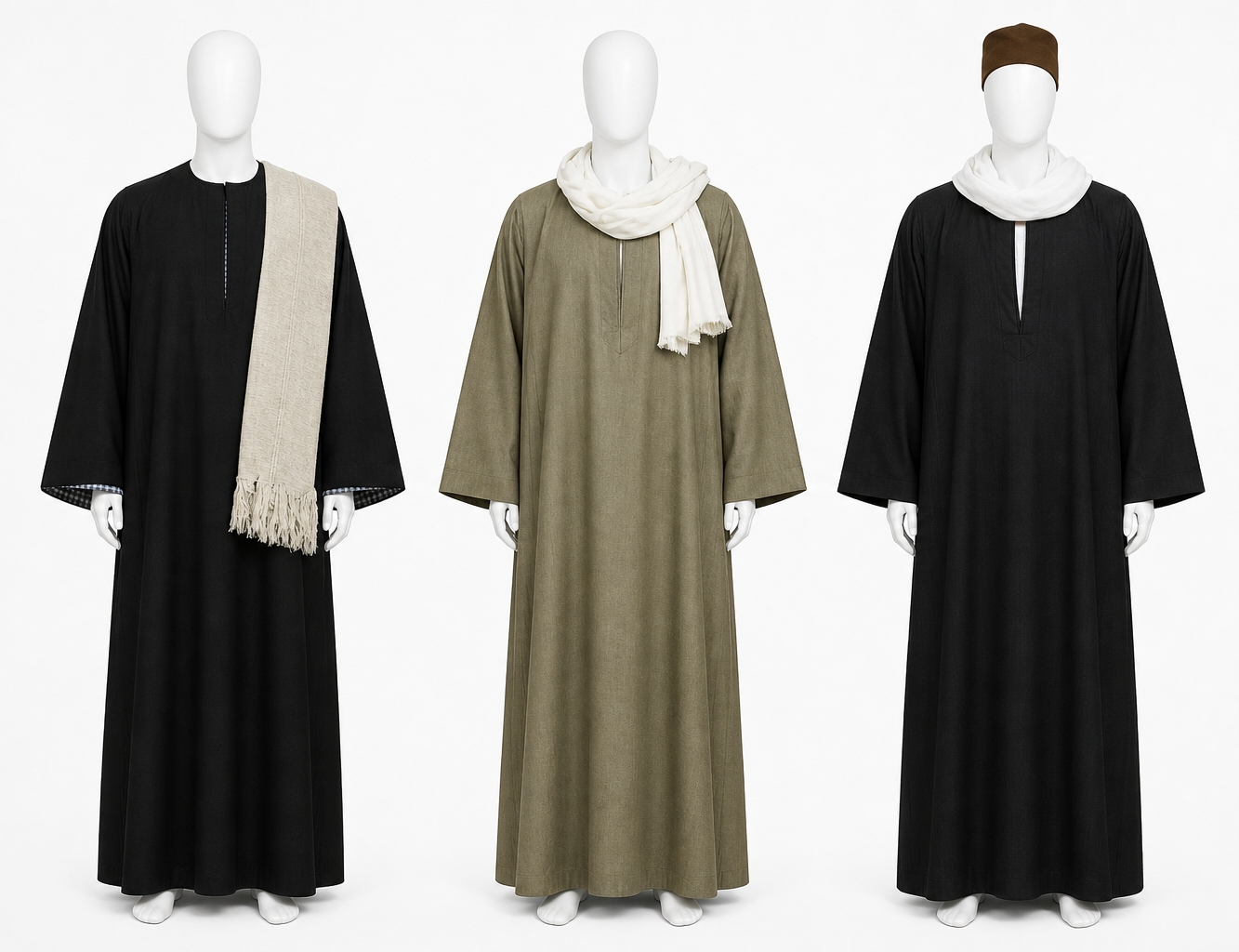

The Jellabiya, also Jalabiya, Galabeya or Dalabiya (Standard Arabic: جَلَّابِيَّة / ALA-LC: Jallābīyah, Sudanese Arabic: Jilabīyah, Egyptian Arabic: Galabiya, Saʽidi Arabic: Dalabiya, Egyptian Arabic: [ɡæ.læ.ˈbej.jæ-]; is a loose-fitting, traditional garment from Egypt. Today, it is the national clothing in Egypt and is particularly associated with Egyptian farmers. It comes in various color varieties. Egyptian jalabiya in its modern form is believed to have originated during the Islamic era in Lower Egypt (the Delta region). The garment is also worn in Sudan, but that variation often has different textures and is usually white.

== History ==
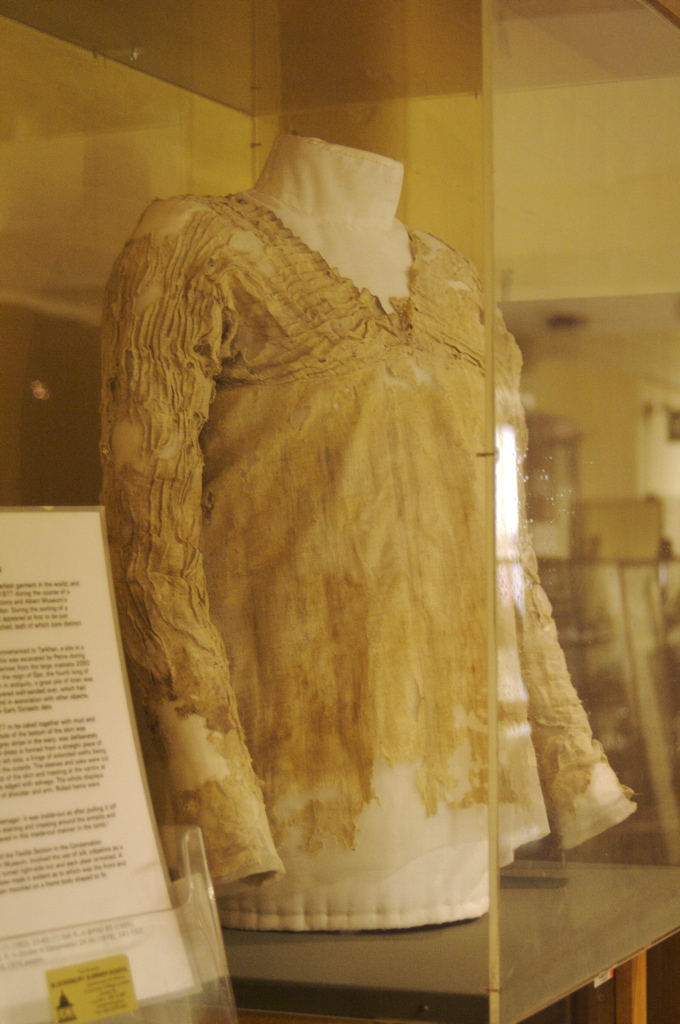
Tarkhan dress (3102 BCE), possible origin of Egyptian Jellabiya, Petrie Museum

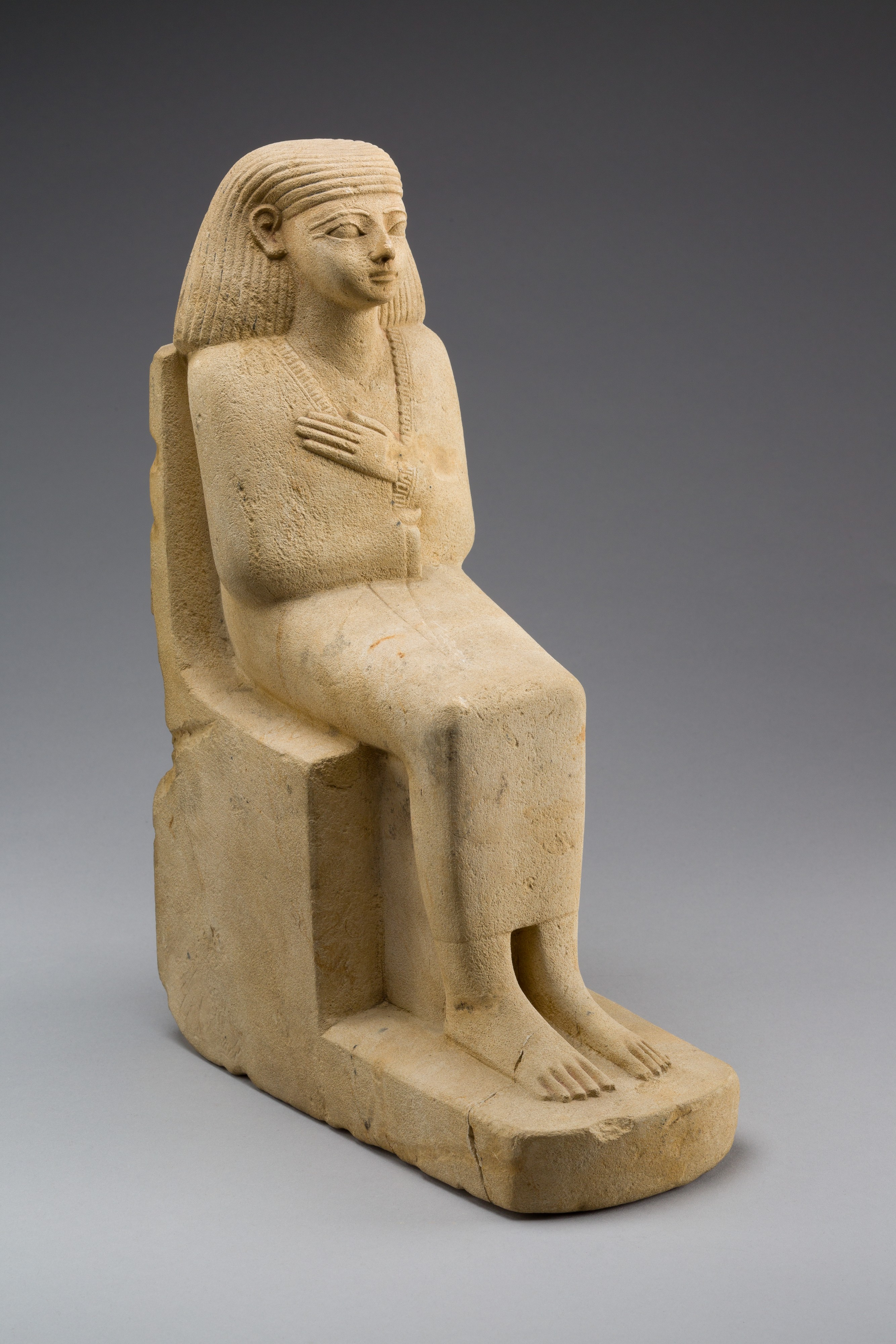
Statue of a seated man in a cloak with similarities to a Jellabya, Middle Kingdom

The earliest forms of Jalabeya can be traced back to Ancient Egypt and Ancient Nubia (modern-day Sudan) where similar long, loose-fitting, simple-collared garments were worn by both men and women. Discoveries like the Tarkhan dress (c. 3482–3102 BCE) housed at the Petrie Museum of Egyptian Archaeology provide early evidence of woven tunic-style clothing.

Excavations at royal burial sites from the Kerma (c. 2500–1500 BCE) and Meroitic Periods (c. 300 BCE – 350 CE) and hundreds of textile fragments recovered from royal pyramids in Sudan further demonstrate a complex clothing culture, often using cotton, a material not yet widely used in Egypt during the same period. Depictions of Nubians in Tomb of Huy (c. 1350 BCE), shown wearing tunics with wide sashes that pre-date the 25th Dynasty, further illustrate that loose-fitting robes were a shared feature of Nile Valley cultures, likely evolving independently or concurrently across both regions.

The current form of jalabiya dates back to the Islamic era in Lower Egypt (the Delta region), after which it spread to the rest of Egypt.

== Design ==
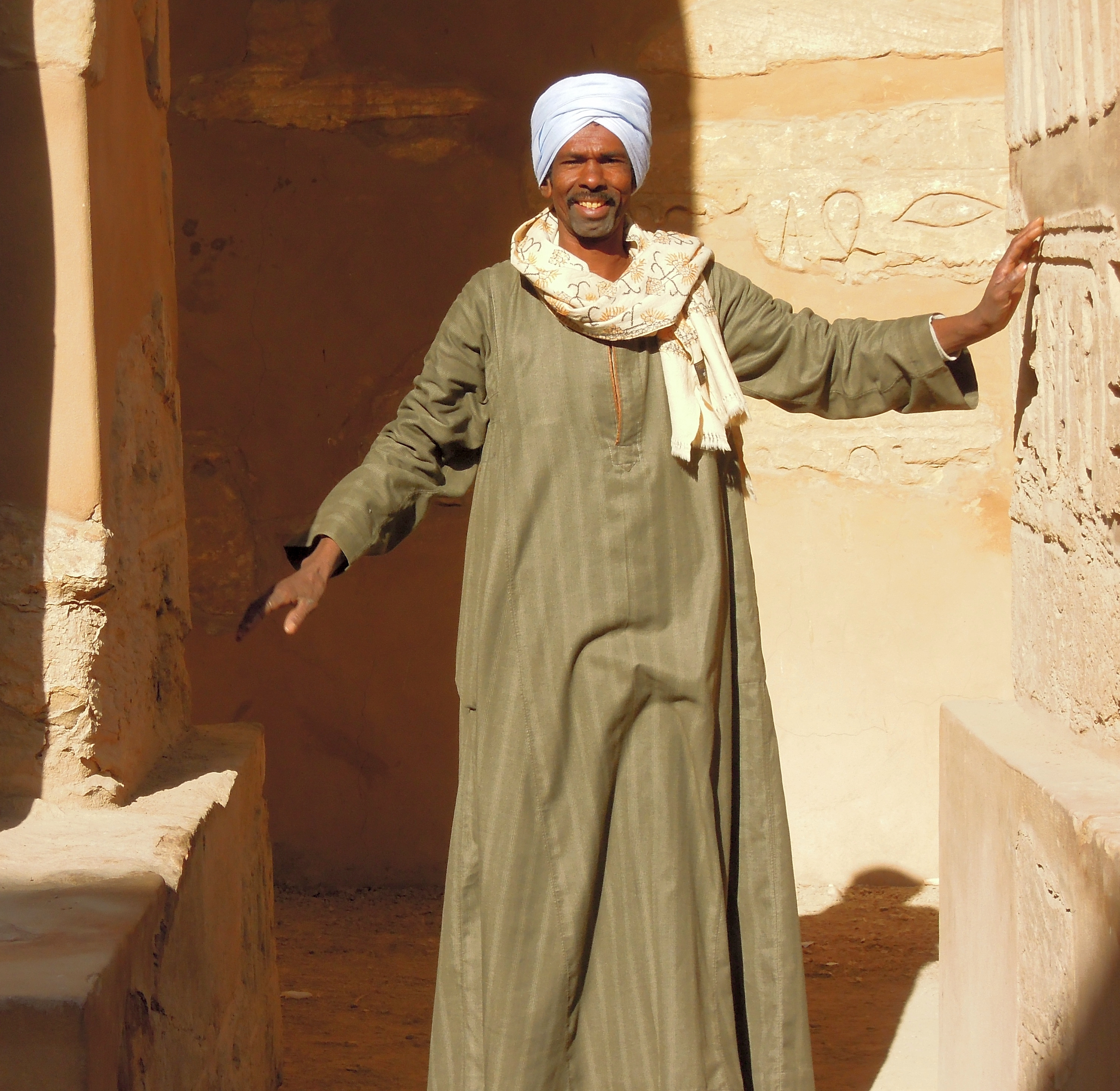
An Egyptian man from Luxor in a traditional jellabiya

The Jalabeya differs from the Arabic thawb, as it has a wider cut, typically no collar (in some cases, no buttons) and longer, wider sleeves. Versions for farmers have very wide sleeves and sewn-in pockets used to carry tobacco, money, or other small items. Along the Red Sea coast in Egypt, and Sudan and among Beja tribesmen, the Arabic dishdash is preferred due to the jalabeya's relation to farming.

Jalabeya worn in summer are often white. During winter, thicker fabrics that are grey, dark green, olive, blue, tan or striped are used, and colorful scarves are worn around the neck or over the head. The garment is traditionally worn with an ammama (turban).

A full male dress in Sudan usually consists of three pieces, the jibba, the kaftan, and the sederi. The gebba/jibba, is the outermost garment characterized by a long opening over the chest. The urban version used to have this opening continue to the end, which made the jibba effectively a long coat. It has one pocket on one side and, on the other side, just an opening that leads to a pocket in the Kaftan, the gallabiya's undergarment. The kaftan is perfectly aligned with the jibba and worn under it for protection against both heat and cold. It is also made of pure cotton to avoid irritation caused by the wool of the winter jibba. Between the kaftan and the jibba there is a sederi (vest) which has small pockets for money, cigarette packs, and even pistols.

== Varieties ==
=== Men's ===
Egyptian boy in a striped galabeya selling merchandise to a foreign Dutch student (1961)

Men's galabeya in Egypt typically have wider hems and sleeves in the country than in the city and a wide neckline with a slit. In the city, there is usually a button placket instead of a simple slit. Dull, solid colors, stripes, and plaid are considered appropriate for men's galabeya, while women's are usually prints and bright colors (or occasionally solid black). In the summer, men's galabeya are made of cotton, while in winter they are made of flannel or wool in darker colors. A heavier galabeya may be worn on top of another and feature couched cord or braid decorations concentrated on the neckline, sometimes with braid buttons.

In Egypt, two men's galabeya with collars exist: the galabeya frangi (foreign) which has a western shirt collar and the galabeya scandarani (Alexandrian) which has a stand collar. They also have breast pockets and collars, buttoned placket front openings, high necklines, and a slightly tighter cut. These are seen as more sophisticated styles of men's galabeya compared to the standard. This clothing has been famous in Arab world with many nationalities.

=== Women's ===
Women's galabeya in Egypt are typically varied along regional lines. The two main styles are the galabeya bi wist (with waist) and galabeya bi sufra (yoked and loose). The former is common in Middle Upper Egypt from Beni Suef to Assiut, and the latter is common in the Delta. Deep Upper Egypt has both, distributed along ethnic lines.

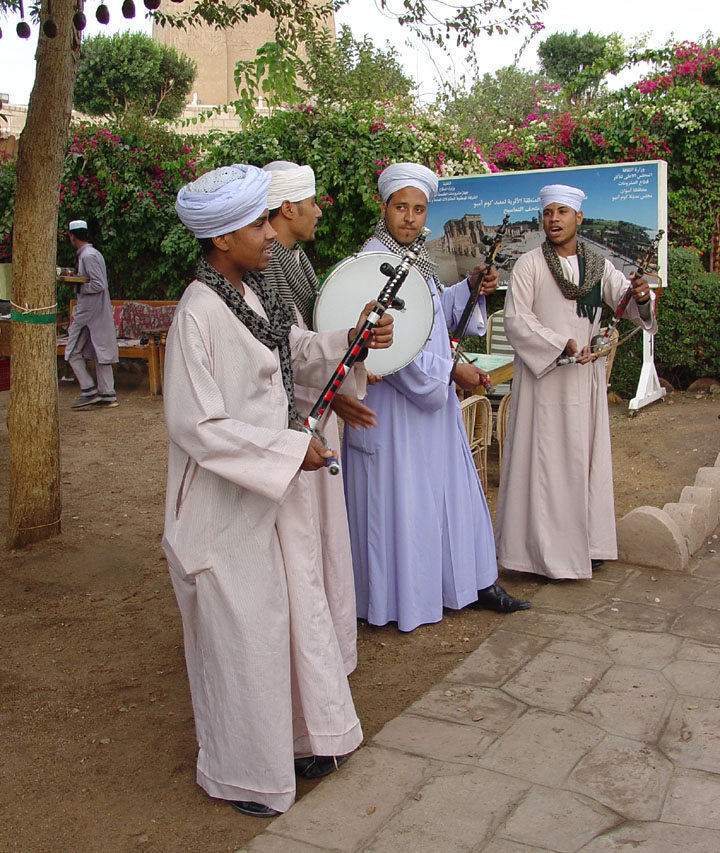
Musicians in Egypt wearing jellabiya

The galabeya bi wist has a bodice and separate skirt. The skirt is either gathered or cut in a bell shape, with a length between the knee and the floor. The waist of the dress is higher than natural to accommodate pregnancy. Sleeves are always 3/4 length or longer and may be gathered or narrow. The popular necklines are V neck, square, open, and collared, and may be combined in design. In Assuit, the galabeya bi wist may have originated as a Coptic Christian fashion, but this distinction is no longer upheld.

The galabeya bi sufra has long, full sleeves. The main differentiation is the decoration, shape of the yoke, presence of a collar, and style of closure. The decorations on the yoke and the gathers or pleats beneath it are meant to enhance the fullness of the breast. These gathers can also hide slits for easy breastfeeding. The back of dress with often have 2–3 pairs of vertical tucks, called ḍafāyir, which echo the two braids many women wear and draw attention to the buttocks, which is where the tucks end. The backs of the yokes sometimes have horizontal tucks. The details of many galabiya bi sufra are likely influenced by late 19th century Western fashions worn by Europeans and wealthy Egyptians and may have been influenced by Regency era fashions due to the French invasion.

Delta galabiya bi sufra commonly have tapered, rather than straight sleeves, with some fullness at the upper arm and a cuff at the wrist. Horizontal tucks, pleats, gathers, and ruffles may also be added to the upper arm. In Sharqeyya, Gharbeyya, Qalyubeyya and Behera, sleeves also have three tucks running along the length of the sleeve. These traits may have been originally used to simulate the leg of mutton, or gigot, sleeve of the 1890s. Skirts are gathered and flared with ruffles and pintucks, and sometimes the skirt is trained. The train sweeps away the footprints and therefore can help defend against the evil eye; it also means that when bent over, the back of the leg is not exposed. In Gharbeyya, Qalyubeyya and Sharqeyya, the center front of the skirt has three vertical tucks along its whole length.

The women's galabeya in Boheria is distinguished by wide piping on the bust in a contrasting color. It is a galabeya bi sufra and found further away from urban centers. The neckline is square, with rows of piping spaced apart from each other outlining it. The specifics of the rest of the piping employs a range of motifs. The dress is gathered, with three tucks in the center front to curtail the fullness from being unmanageable. The ruffle at the bottom of the dress is about 8 inches tall. The sleeves are full with three tucks along the length and two horizontal tucks at the shoulder, and ribbon and piping is used to outline the silhouette of a cuff. The dress fabric is always colorful.

The traditional dress of Kirdasa is a galabiya bi sufra and made of floral fabric with a beaded yoke, like that of Abu Rawwash. The fabric of the yoke is black. Beading has fallen out of use and dresses are typically brown, blue, or black. The malas dress was also worn there. The dress of Sharqeyya was similar to Kirdasa, sometimes with beading and sometimes without, but fell out of use decades ago.

The dress in Behera, which mostly has a population of Beoduin origin, is a galabiya bi sufra, and has variations based on neckline. The square neckline (ṣadr murabbaʿ) has a contrasting inset in the neckline and bordering the yoke, and trim called soutage, or sirit satan, framing the neck. Satin braids encircle the dress as the bust. The V neckline (ḥarmala) only uses sirit satan to decorate the yoke. The sleeves have three concentric tucks at the top, called buffa. The skirt has a large flounce and three vertical tucks in the center front. There are two horizontal tucks above the flounce. Large, multicolor prints are preferred to small prints or black cloth- this is generally true of Beoduins in Egypt. Fellahin women, on the other hand, prefer black and other subdued fabrics.

Women's dress in Gharbeyya is of the galabiya bi sufra type. The yoke and cuffs were decorated with tentanah, a zig zag trim. The bust line is framed with two horizontal rows of braid, which dip down in the center in a narrow U shape. Black velvet was also used to trim dresses on the bust and cuffs. The back of the skirt is cut for a train and has dafayir, and the front has three center front vertical tucks, and several horizontal tucks above a flounce. A large epaulet like tuck sits at the top of the sleeve. In public, multiple simple dresses, usually with small print patterns, are worn on top of each other. Formal dresses were usually of darker colored fabric, with a pointed square neckline. A velvet shawl may be worn for warmth, and if one could afford it, wool and brushed cotton could be purchased for colder weather clothing. Velvets, rayon, and cotton sateens are available and used in the area.

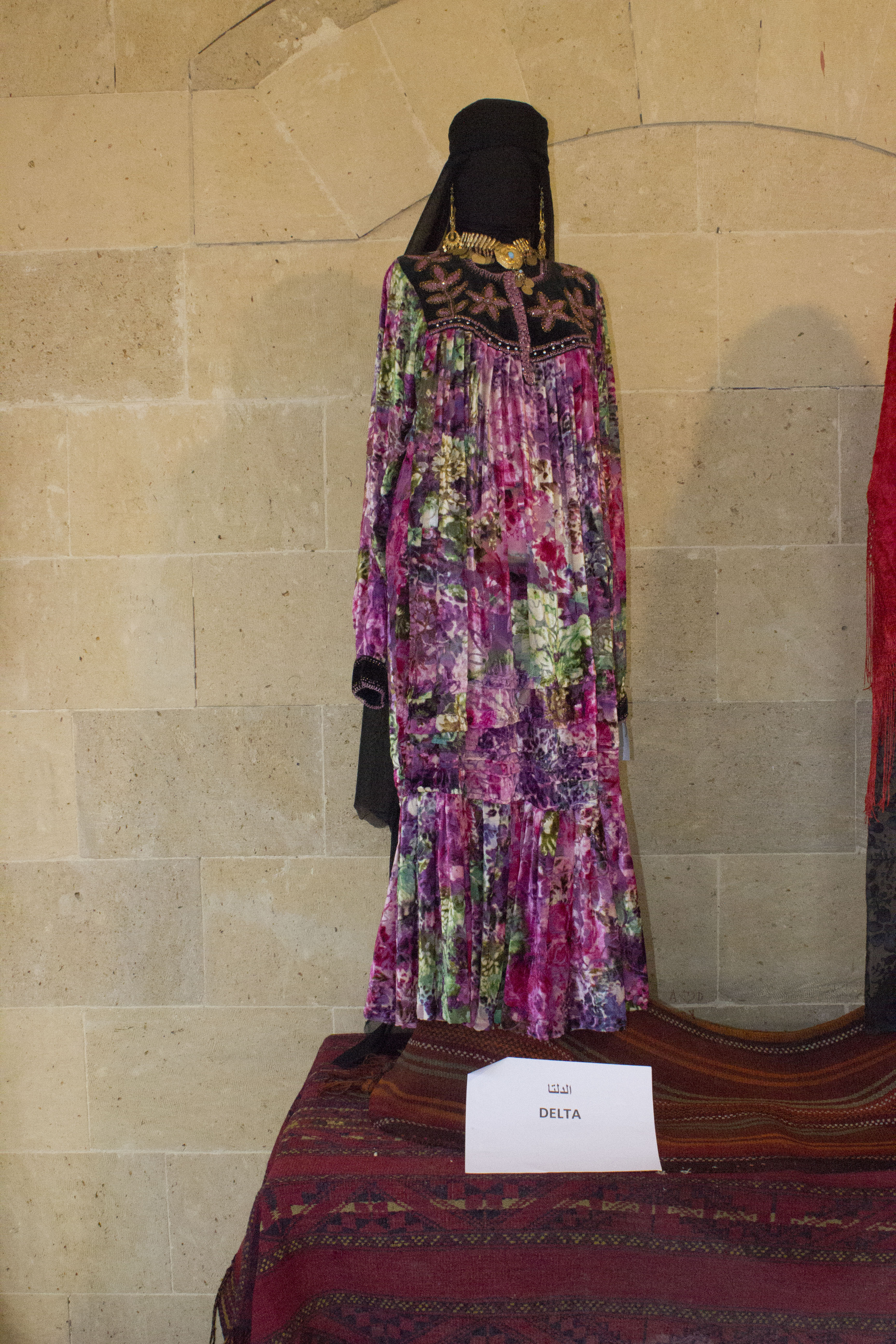
A beaded galabiya bi sufra from the Nile Delta

The dresses of Giza include the malas dress, which persisted as casual wear into the 1990s in the village of Nazlit al Semman. The malas there was woven of white silk, dyed red, cut and sewn, and finally dyed black, with starch used to fix the dye. In Abu Rawwash, the dress was a colorful galabiya bi sufra with a beaded yoke, and shiny fabric was preferred. Today villagers have shifted to dark fabrics. Golden beads are preferred, with rhinestones used to accent. A few motifs are used; the kirdan motif has stylized flowers and resembles a necklace. The namisa motif is made of rows of straight, dense packed beads, with accenting zig zag lines. The zig zags are called sikkit Fārūq, because they resemble a "king's road". If a dress is beaded today, it typically has this pattern. These motifs go with a front placket hiding snap closures, with beads covering the placket. The Ḫarǧ al naǧaf resembles two wings sprouting from a small circle in center front. It has no placket, and the yoke ends with triangular dags where it meets the skirt. Some yokes are machine embroidered, but they are more expensive as machine embroidery is done by men, as women cannot usually afford embroidery machines in the village and do not have the training to use them. The sleeves have tucks at the shoulder. The skirt is pleated and has a very tall flounce at the bottom, with two horizontal tucks above it. "Trompe-l'œil" buttons are sometimes used.

The dress in Saqqara is a galabiya bi sufra, with a pleated front skirt and dafayir. The flounce on the skirt is narrower than usual, and colored solid fabrics seem to be preferred. The diamond neckline has a pointed yoke as well. There are two trimmings for it. For the first, the edge of the yoke is outlined in black velvet, and black velvet is appliqued on the yoke in a faux collar silhouette. This is outlined with rows of beads. The second diamond neckline trimming has the bottom edge of the yoke trimmed with two rows of black velvet. The neckline is edged with a wide band of black velvet and rhinestones. The square neckline has two horizontal bands of black velvet, with a line of braid or beads between them and two vertical bands if black velvet on each side of the yoke with a line of braid between them. The bottom of this yoke often has triangular dags where it meets the skirt. Black velvet is also used for the sleeve cuffs. The sleeves are gathered at the top and have a tuck. "Trompe-l'œil" buttons are sometimes used.

The dress in Bortos is a galabiya bi sufra. It has a diamond neckline, concentric tucks at the top of the sleeve, pleats on the front of the skirt and dafayir in the back. The yoke and cuffs may be machine embroidered in metallic threads, possibly inspired by sirma embroidery. Solid colors, small prints, and striped ton sur ton (a black cloth with alternating shiny and dull stripes) were used.

In Tanash, the dress is a galabiya bi sufra of medium print colorful cotton. It has a square neckline trimmed with a contrasting color, with zig zag and lozenge shapes used. The yoke is pointed and trimmed with that color, and the sleeve cuffs are made of it too. The skirt is pleated, and has horizontal tucks, a flounce, and dafayir in the back.

Menufeyya's dress is similar to Gharbeyya's. It has a square neckline framed in black velvet, or with zig zag trim. Scallop or zig zag trim can be used on the edge of the yoke and around the velvet, and may be applied in geometric patterns on the yoke. The skirt may be gathered instead of pleated.

The dress of Kafr Mansur has a yoke just below the bosom. Other than this detail, it is of the galabiya bi sufra type. The neckline is round with a placket on the back hiding snaps. The sleeves are gathered at the top and have embroidered cuffs. The embroidery is executed on machine and may be using the floral motifs of couched cord (tutturma in Turkish; fetla in the Maghreb) that were popular in urban 19th century dress, and still occasionally appear on vests in Egypt. These motifs also resemble the aġabānī of Syria. The embroidery circles the neck, extends on a rectangle inset of contrast fabric, and extends in a band along the edge of the yoke. More embroidery is done on top of the flounce on the skirt hem. The skirt is gathered. The dresses are colorful in solid or print and embroidered with contrasting rayon thread.

Abu al Ghait's dress is a galabiya bi sufra. It has a square neckline and horizontal yoke, covered in machine embroidery with metallic threads serving as accents. The sleeves are gathered at the top and have cuffs. The skirt is gathered, has a large tuck near the bottom and lacks a flounce.

Kafr Ramada's dress is a galabiya bi sufra. The yokes are decorated with ribbons and strips of cloth cut and sewn to form zig zags and trellis (šabābīk, "windows") patterns, or inserts and braid. The neckline may be square with a U shaped yoke, or a diamond neckline with a pointed yoke. The back yoke has three parallel pleats. The front of the skirt is gathered and the back has dafayir. The flounce on the skirt is narrow and has a zig zag trim above it.

In Salamant, the dress is a galabiya bi sufra. Two rows of šabābīk border each side of a square neckline, and another horizontal row runs beneath it. Beads are embroidered in star shaped patterns on top of this, and edge the seams and neckline. The bottom of the yoke has large triangular dags decorated with festoons of beads (foll). The back of the yoke has three parallel tucks. The sleeves have three concentric tucks at the top. The skirt is pleated in front, with three center front vertical tucks, and has dafayir in the back. There is a medium size flounce on the skirt with three horizontal tucks above it on the front, creating a train in the back. This was a formal dress, and was made if black or other dark fabric, in cotton, rayon or velvet. Small dark prints were also used. Beads were plain black, dark with a purple, green, or blue metallic glint (these are called "pigeon neck" beads), or occasionally in dark gold.

Mit Hamal's dress is a galabiya bi sufra in plain black cotton with no embroidery, trimmed with šabābīk. The neckline is square with a pointed yoke. The fabric is cut into strips and sewn down in festoons (foll) along the bottom of the yoke. The skirt is pleated in front, with dafayir in the back. Three tucks (buffa) are at the top of the sleeve, and three perpendicular tucks run along its length. Sometimes a more expensive dress with Salamant style beading was worn. The pointed yoke under this beading had an inset with a dagged edge around the neckline. These and the bottom of the yoke were edged with fabric foll festoons. Sometimes instead of following festoons, tiny pieces of folded fabric resembling pinked ribbon were used. A pointed neckline with Salamant style beading may have a black inset cut to resemble lapels and edged in foll festoons.

Inchas has a few dresses of the galabiya bi sufra type. The Kūbrī al Zamālik (Zamalek bridge) dress has a square neckline and a pointed yoke with fabric foll festoons on its bottom edge. The yoke has two vertical rows of šabābīk on each side of the neckline. The point at the bottom of the neckline is bordered by two inverted triangles made of strips sewn together, also called šabābīk. This set of triangles taken together resembles a bridge. This can either be further beaded or decorated with ribbon. Pigeon neck or gold beads are favored for the former. The bīyīhāt dress has an oval neckline and a yoke with a dagged bottom. The yoke is divided into three sections; there are two rectangles on each side of the neckline which meet the bottom edge. These rectangles are filled by bias strips wound up concentrically and stitched together with eyelet stitches (ajour). It is beaded with stylized leaves, flowers, and chevrons. The barsima dress either refers to a formal dress with an oval neckline and pleated pointed yoke, beaded similar to the Salamant style; or a house dress of the same neckline and yoke, made of cotton and decorated with satin ribbon in floral and leaf patterns. Another type is a square neckline with a dagged yoke. The neckline is framed on three sides by šabābīk. It is beaded with zig zags in vertical and horizontal rows on both sides of the šabābīk, and more zig zag beading on the bottom edge of the yoke.

Saft al Henna's dress is a galabiya bi sufra, with a few varieties. One has a pointed neckline and yoke. The neckline is framed by an inset of the dress material in a collar outline, detailed with šarāyiṭ satān around the edge. More šarāyiṭ satān goes on the bottom of the yoke, and is used to make a line of šabābīk just above it. A small bow sits at the bottom of the neckline. Another has a pointed neckline with a square yoke. Two lines of šabābīk go on each side of the neckline, and three "fingers" filled with šabābīk protrude from the bottom of the yoke onto the skirt. The šabābīk are edged with šarāyiṭ satān, which also outlines the neckline and bottom of the yoke. A small bow sits at the bottom of the neckline. A third dress has a square neckline with a dagged yoke divided into three sections. On each side of the neck are panels that are outlined to the bottom the yoke, and filling the square between these and under the neckline is šabābīk. All of these details were made of šarāyiṭ satān. Unusually, all the gathers on the front skirt were positioned under this square. This dress, unlike the former two, was casual wear.

Ghazala al Khais' dresses are galabiya bi sufra, though theirs lack the gathers in the front and dafayir in the back that other Delta dresses sport. The Saʿd Āyim dress has a round neck and square yoke. Velvet ribbons or šarāyiṭ satān in dark colors outline the neck, yoke, and cuffs. From the bottom of the neck to the hem are two vertical lines of the trim, and in between those lines is a stack of chevrons. The second dress has a decorated yoke and a gathered skirt. The yoke has a type of simple smocking called ʿišš al naml (ant's nests), with beads in between the gathers. Smocking is not found on any other contemporary Delta dress, but some antique and medieval examples exist.

The foll trim is named after a fragrant flower, either Arabian Jasmine, Spanish Jasmine, or mock orange, which used to be made into scented necklaces in Egypt.

In the UAE, the jalabiya is a fashionable piece of clothing, wearing it with a matching headscarf is usually the attire worn. It usually comes with beautiful embroidery and crystals and be worn for casual days and even for special events.

== See also ==
- Ammama
- Bekishe
- Burnous
- Djellaba
- Hijab
- Jilbāb
- Thawb
