= 1888–1892 Sudan famine =

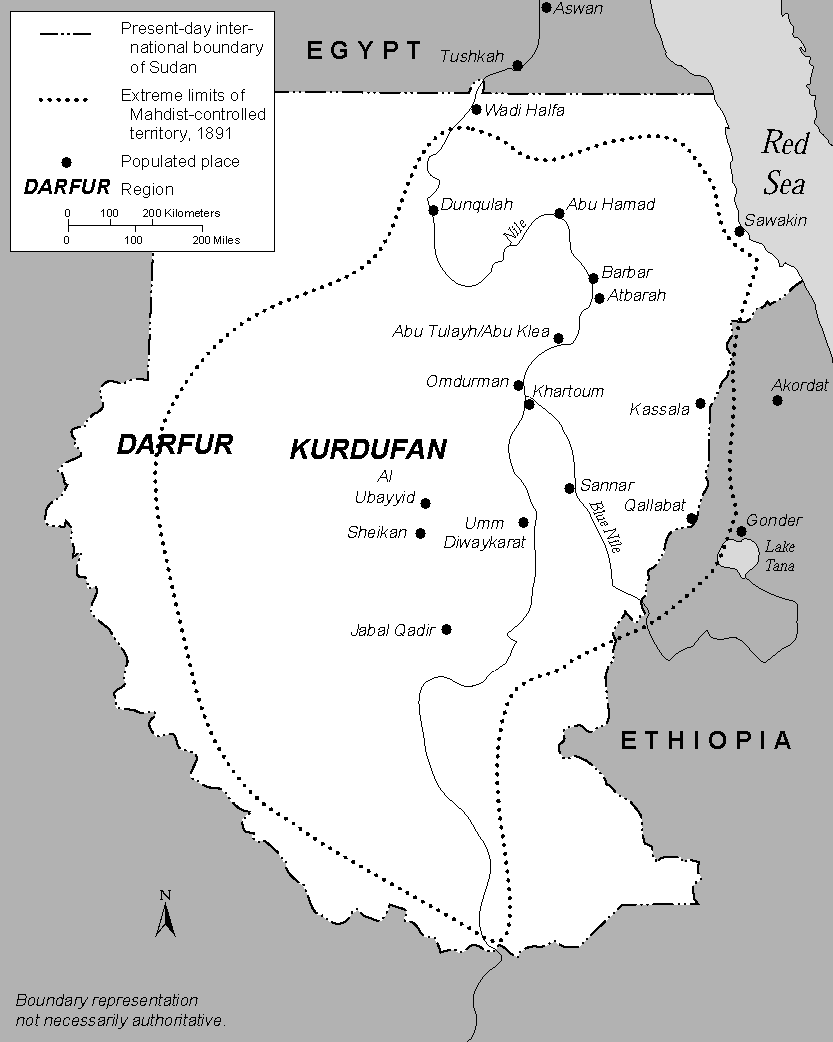
- The maximum extent of the Mahdist State from 1881 to 1898, with national boundaries as of 2000 displayed.
- Date: 1888-1892
- Duration: 4 years
- Location: Sudan
- Cause: War, migration, drought, British blockade
- Deaths: ~ 1,500,000

The 1888–1892 Sudan famine also known as the Famine of the Year Six or the Sanat 6 was one of the most devastating famines which affected the whole of Sudan. The famine killed around 1,500,000 Sudanese and was caused by the ongoing Mahdist War, heavy drought and migration.

== Background ==
The Mahdist revolution which began in 1881 and was led by a Muslim cleric Muhammad Ahmad who declared himself as a Mahdi. He composed an Islamic army and declared an holy war against the Ottoman-Egyptian rule in Sudan in order to overthrow the current government and establish an Islamic state. From 1885 until the end of the Jihadist rebellion in 1898 the Mahdist government controlled and maintained sovereignty over most of the Sudanese state. During the late 1880s the Mahdist state was facing serious political and military challenges. While fighting the Egyptian army in the northern and eastern parts of the country, The Mahdist army had to also suppress the ongoing revolt in Darfur as the Fur sultanate was trying to rebuild itself after being conquered by the Mahdists.

== The famine ==
Main reasons for the famine was a high migration from Darfur towards Omdurman and a severe drought which hit Sudan in 1888. The current political hardships combined with heavy losses against Ethiopia and The Anglo-Egyptian army lead the leader of the Mahdists Abdallahi ibn Muhammad to call for an enforced migration of his own Tai'sha tribe and their neighboring Baggara tribes towards Omdurman. The great tribal migrations, heavy drought and a total crop failure led to Sudanese food supplies depleting and the famine becoming uncontrollable. In 1890 Lord Kitchener commanding the British and Indian forces in Suakin,closed the port of Suakin,and stopped grain exports to the Mahdist state, which worsened the ongoing famine. The drought brought in locust swarms which destroyed remaining crops. The Mahdist state struggled feeding the dying civilian population while maintaining a massive army, which was fighting against the Fur sultanate and Anglo-Egyptian army. Other factions contributing to the famine were a severe Cholera epidemic and Rinderpest epidemic among cattle which lead to pastoralists not being able to buy wheat or sorghum. The famine was devastating to the whole of Sudan and killed around 1,500,000 Sudanese people.
