= Battle of Toski =

1889 battle of the Mahdist War

- Part of the Mahdist War
- The defeat of the dervishes; a birds eye view of the fight outside Toski on August 3
Date	3 August 1889
Location	Southern Egypt, near Abu Simbel
Result	Egyptian/British Victory

Belligerents
(United Kingdom of Great Britain and Ireland) United Kingdom; Egypt	Mahdist State

Commanders and leaders
(United Kingdom of Great Britain and Ireland) Francis Grenfell	Wad el Nujumi †

Strength
Egyptian Army: 6 infantry battalions, 2 artillery batteries 4 cavalry squadrons 1 camel regiment British Army: 1 cavalry squadron	About 6,000

Casualties and losses
25 killed, 140 wounded	1,200 dead, 4,000 captured

The Battle of Toski (Tushkah) was part of the Mahdist War. It took place on August 3, 1889, in southern Egypt between the Anglo-Egyptian forces and the Mahdist forces of the Sudan.

Since 1882, the British had taken control of Egypt and found themselves involved in the Mahdist War. For this reason, they decided to reform and rearm the Egyptian Army. In 1885 a British general, Sir Francis Grenfell was appointed Sirdar (commander-in-chief) and British officers trained and led the newly formed units.

The Sudanese, on the other hand had not renounced their ambition of spreading the Mahdist faith to Egypt. In 1889, the Khalifa Abdallahi ibn Muhammad sent the Emir Wad-el-Nujumi and an army 6,000 strong into Egypt for this purpose. The Mahdists avoided Wadi Halfa where most of the Egyptian troops were garrisoned, and camped at Toski by the Nile, 76 km north of the Egypt–Sudan border. Here they were attacked by the Egyptian Army, who nearly annihilated the Sudanese after a five-hour fight. The Emir was killed trying to rally his men with only 800 Mahdist warriors escaping. Apart from the officers commanding the Egyptian units, the only British troops participating were a squadron of the 20th Hussars.

This battle demonstrated the fighting qualities of the reformed Egyptian Army, including the newly raised Sudanese units that made up four of the six infantry battalions present, and effectively ended the Mahdist threat to Egypt.
