= Battle of Umm Diwaykarat =

1899 Anglo-Egyptian defeat of the Mahdist State

- Part of the Mahdist War
Date	25 November 1899
Location	Kordofan, Sudan
Result	Anglo-Egyptian victory
Territorial changes	Anglo-Egyptian reconquest of Sudan

Belligerents
United Kingdom; Khedivate of Egypt	Mahdist State

Commanders and leaders
(United Kingdom of Great Britain and Ireland) Reginald Wingate	(Mahdist State) Abdallahi ibn Muhammad †

Strength
8,000	10,000

Casualties and losses
3 killed, 23 wounded	1,000 killed and wounded, 3,000 captured

The Battle of Umm Diwaykarat on 25 November 1899 marked the final defeat of the Mahdist State in Sudan, when Anglo-Egyptian forces under the command of Lord Kitchener defeated what was left of the Mahdist armies under the command of the Abdallahi ibn Muhammad, known as the Khalifa, after the equally disastrous Battle of Omdurman a year earlier.

== Background ==
After Omdurman, the defeated Mahdist forces, still 25,000 strong, moved southward from Khartoum to Kordofan. The Mahdists still controlled the territory of Kordofan, Darfur, and lands bordering Ethiopia. In October 1899 the British obtained information that the Khalifa and his forces were among his native Baggara to the west of Kusti (Kaka) in Kordofan. Kitchener dispatched 8,000 Sudanese and Egyptian soldiers under command of General F.R. Wingate to intercept him. Wingate marched from Kusti to the mountains of Kordofan, destroyed a Mahdist supply unit, and soon located the Khalifa's camp.

== Battle ==
By this time, the Khalifa's Sudanese forces had retained at least 10,000 people. The Khalifa decided to make a stand rather than to retreat further. During the night Wingate approached the camp from the east and the north sides. At about 5am, the Mahdists began to attack the approaching British-led forces, but were driven back by withering fire from Maxim guns. The Khalifa's attempts to rally his men failed, and he soon accepted that all was lost. He called his main leaders to sit with him on a farwa – a yearling skin; to wait for death. His guards protected him, but all were mown down by the fire of the Anglo-Egyptian forces.

Around 1,000 of the Mahdist forces were killed and wounded. The Sudanese/Egyptian forces captured many of the rest, including a son of Emir Yuni.

== Aftermath ==
Osman Digna was injured almost at the start of the battle, and fled after being taken from the field; the only Emir to do so. After the defeat, the remnants of the Mahdists continued to resist for a short while under his command, but he was caught in January 1900. The last unoccupied territories of Darfur were captured in 1916.
