= Mahdist State =

1885–1899 Sudanese state

Coordinates: 15°38′54″N 32°29′03″E

Mahdist State الدولة المهدية (Arabic) Al-Dawla al-Mahdiyah
- 1885–1899
- One of the flags of the Mahdi movement; most Mahdist flags varied in color but were similar to this one in their style.

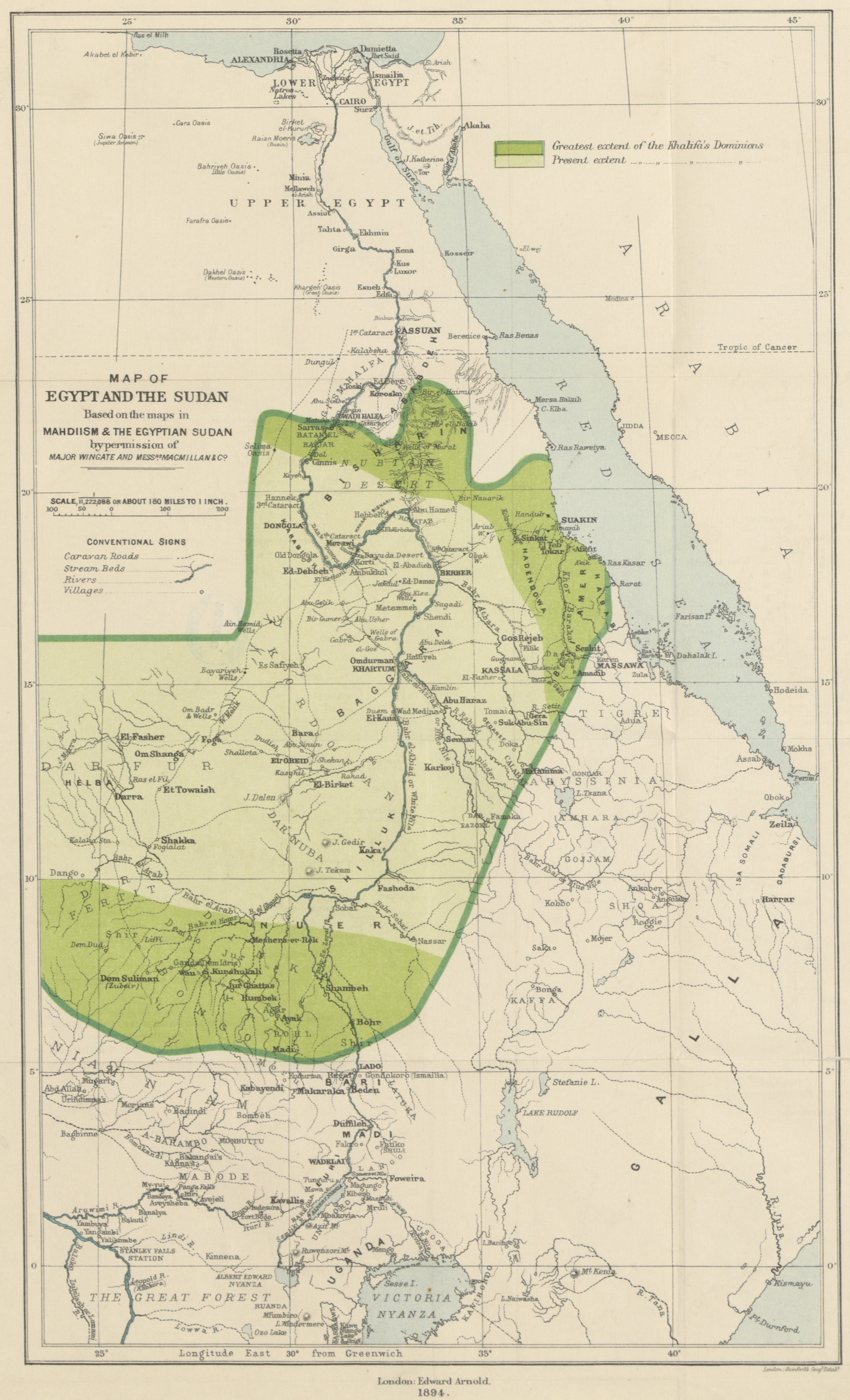
- 1894 map of Mahdist Sudan
- Status: Unrecognized state
- Capital: Omdurman
- Common languages: Sudanese Arabic Nubian languages Other languages of Sudan
- Religion: Islam
- Government: Islamic state
- Mahdi
  - 1881–1885: Muhammad Ahmad
- Khalifa
  - 1885–1899: Abdallahi ibn Muhammad
- Legislature: Shura council
- Historical era: Scramble for Africa
  - Mahdist War: 1881–1885
  - Fall of Khartoum: 26 January 1885
  - Sudan Convention: 18 January 1899
  - Battle of Umm Diwaykarat: 24 November 1899
  - Fall of Sanin Husain's holdout: 1909

Population
  - Pre-Mahdist: 7,000,000
  - Post-Mahdist: 2,000,000–3,000,000
- Currency: Legal tender: Riyal maqbul (silver); De facto currencies: Ottoman riyal majidi, Spanish dollar, Maria Theresa thaler
Preceded by	Succeeded by
Turco-Egyptian Sudan	Anglo-Egyptian Sudan; Sultanate of Darfur
- Today part of: Sudan; South Sudan; Central African Republic; Ethiopia; Eritrea; Chad

The Mahdist State, also known as Mahdist Sudan or the Sudanese Mahdiyya, was a state based on a religious and political movement launched in 1881 by Muhammad Ahmad (later Muhammad al-Mahdi) against the Khedivate of Egypt, which had ruled Sudan since 1821. After four years of struggle, the Mahdist rebels overthrew the Ottoman-Egyptian administration and established their own "Islamic and national" government with its capital in Omdurman. Thus, from 1885 the Mahdist government maintained sovereignty and control over the Sudanese territories until its existence was terminated by Anglo-Egyptian forces in 1898.

Muhammad Ahmad al-Mahdi enlisted the people of Sudan in what he declared a jihad against the administration that was based in Khartoum, which was dominated by Egyptians and Turks. The Khartoum government initially dismissed the Mahdi's revolution. He defeated two expeditions sent to capture him in the course of a year. The Mahdi's power increased, and his call spread throughout Sudan, with his movement becoming known as the Ansar. During the same period, the 'Urabi revolution broke out in Egypt, with the British occupying the country in 1882. Britain appointed Charles Gordon as General-Governor of Sudan. Months after his arrival in Khartoum and after several battles with the Mahdi rebels, Mahdist forces captured Khartoum, and Gordon was killed in his palace. The Mahdi did not live long after this victory, and his successor Abdallahi ibn Muhammad consolidated the new state, with administrative and judiciary systems based on their interpretation of Islamic law. The Coptic Christians, who composed a substantial portion of the country's population, were forced to convert to Islam.

Sudan's economy was destroyed during the Mahdist War and famine, war and disease reduced the population by more than half.

The British reconquered Sudan in 1898, ruling it after that in theory as a condominium with Egypt but in practice as a colony. However, remnants of the Mahdist State held out in Darfur until 1909.

== History ==
=== Background ===
From the early 19th century, Egypt had begun to conquer Sudan and subjugated it as a source of human and material resources. This period became locally known as the Turkiyya, i.e. the "Turkish" rule by the Eyalet and later Khedivate of Egypt. The name was something of a misnomer: the Egyptians recruited local Sudanese for initially low-level, and then later quite high-level official posts. Egyptian control integrated Sudan into global commercial networks, but Egypt's trans-Mediterranean links proved a doubled-edged sword. In 1869, the Suez Canal opened and quickly became a key economic lifeline for the British Empire in India and the Far East. To defend this waterway, Britain sought a greater role in Egyptian affairs.

In 1873, the British government therefore supported a programme whereby an Anglo-French debt commission assumed responsibility for managing Egypt's fiscal affairs. To appease the commission, the Egyptians allowed Christian missionaries to proselytize throughout the Sudan. Meanwhile, Khedive Ismail appointed the Briton Charles George Gordon as governor-general of the Sudan. Gordon's (and the general British) commitment to abolition squarely opposed the traditional Sudanese economy, which was coming to center on the slave trade now that ivory sources were being exhausted.

The debt commission eventually forced the Khedive to abdicate in 1877 for his more politically acceptable son, Tawfiq (reigned 1877–1892). In 1879, Egypt fell into the chaos of the Urabi revolt, and shortly thereafter Gordon resigned. His successors lacked direction from Cairo, and Sudanese discontent grew rapidly. The illegal slave trade revived, although not enough to satisfy the merchants whom Gordon had bankrupted. The Sudanese army suffered from a lack of resources, and unemployed soldiers from disbanded units troubled garrison towns. Tax collectors arbitrarily increased taxation.

=== Muhammad Ahmad ===
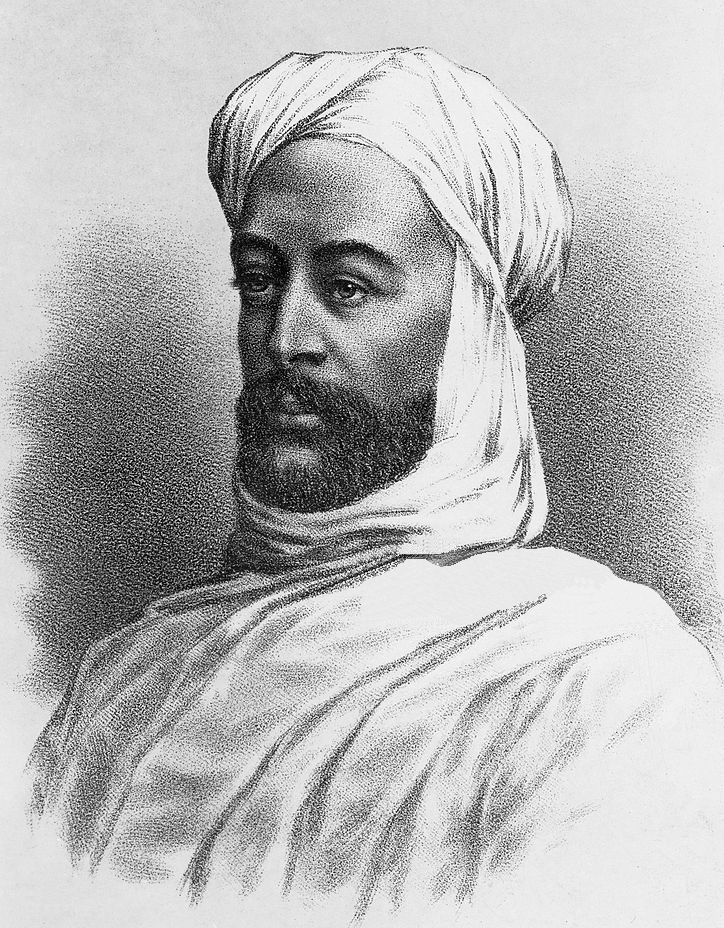
Muhammad Ahmad al-Mahdi

In this troubled atmosphere, Muhammad Ahmad ibn as Sayyid Abd Allah, who combined personal charisma with a religious and political mission, emerged, determined to expel the Turks and restore Islam to its original purity. The son of a Danagla boatbuilder, Muhammad Ahmad had become the disciple of Muhammad ash Sharif, the head of the Sammaniyah Sufi order. Later, as a sheikh of the order, Muhammad Ahmad spent several years in seclusion and gained a reputation as a mystic and teacher.

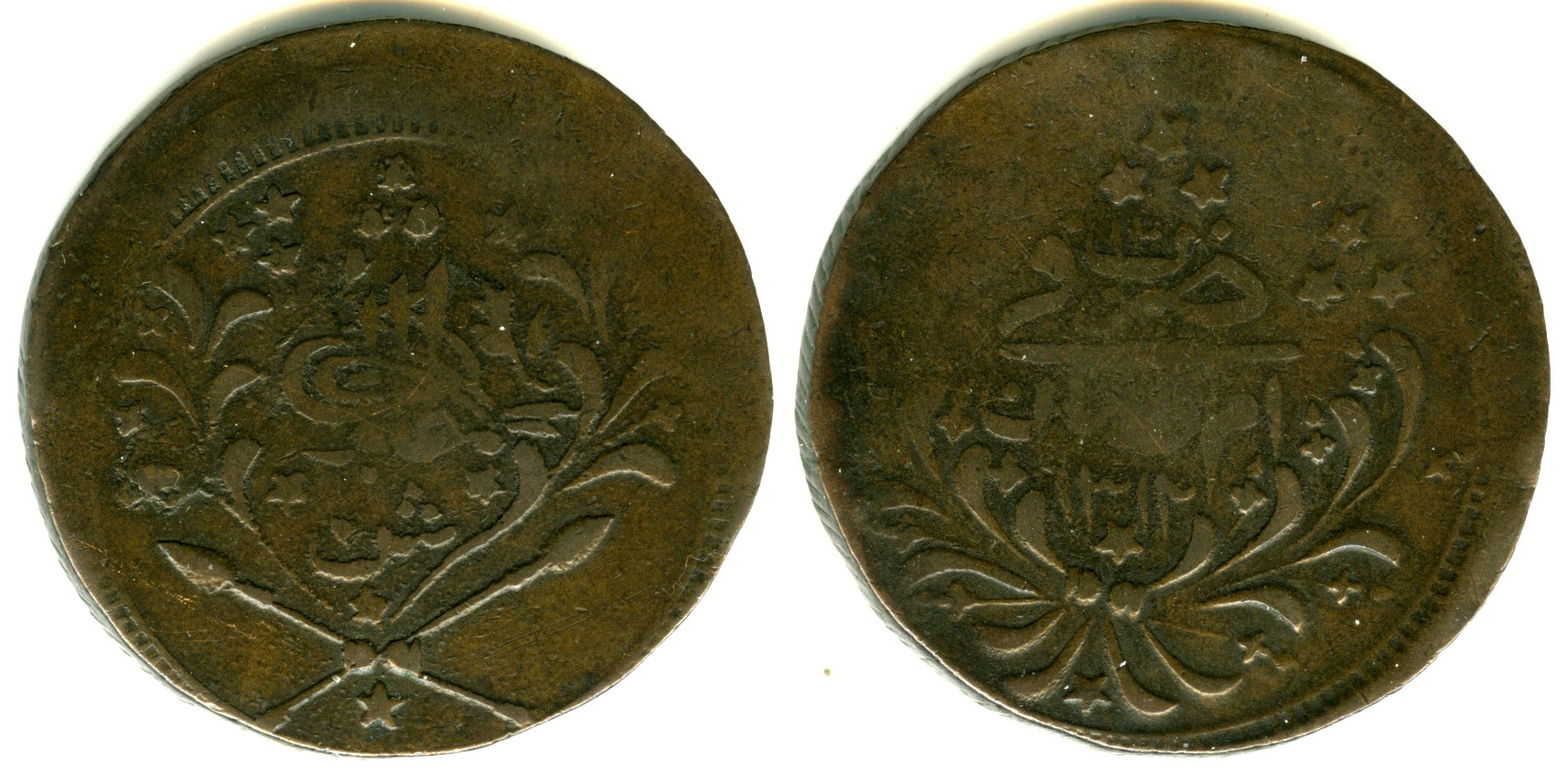
A 20 qurush coin minted during the reign of Abdallahi ibn Muhammad.

In 1881, Muhammad Ahmad proclaimed himself the Mahdi ("expected one"). Some of his most dedicated followers regarded him as directly inspired by Allah. He wanted Muslims to reclaim the Quran and hadith as the foundational sources of Islam, creating a just society. Specifically relating to Sudan, he claimed its poverty was a virtue and denounced worldly wealth and luxury. For Muhammad Ahmad, Egypt was an example of wealth leading to impious behavior. Muhammad Ahmad's calls for an uprising found great appeal among the poorest communities along the Nile, as it combined a nationalist, anti-Egyptian agenda with fundamentalist religious certainty.

Even after the Mahdi proclaimed a jihad, or holy war, against the Egyptians, Khartoum dismissed him as a religious fanatic. The Egyptian government paid more attention when his religious zeal turned to denunciation of tax collectors. To avoid arrest, the Mahdi and a party of his followers, the Ansar, made a long march to Kurdufan, where he gained a large number of recruits, especially from the Baggara. From a refuge in the area, he wrote appeals to the sheikhs of the religious orders and won active support or assurances of neutrality from all except the pro-Egyptian Khatmiyyah. Merchants and Arab tribes that had depended on the slave trade responded as well, along with the Hadendoa Beja, who were rallied to the Mahdi by an Ansar captain, Osman Digna.

Ahmad's new polity functioned as a jihad state, run like a military camp. The Mahdiyah equalized its male citizenry in totalitarian asceticism, mandating communal jibba; and firmly excluded women from all public space. The Mahdi dissolved all fiqh, insisting on the literal meaning of the Quran. Sharia courts enforced Islamic law and the Mahdi's precepts, which had the force of law. A contemporary scout on behalf of Muhammad as-Sanusi described the land as "a burning country, dying and reeking of death".

=== Advancing attacks ===
Early in 1882, the Ansar, armed with spears and swords, overwhelmed a British-led 7,000-man Egyptian force not far from Al Ubayyid and seized their rifles, field guns and ammunition. The Mahdi followed up this victory by laying siege to Al Ubayyid and starving it into submission after four months. The Ansar, 30,000 men strong, then defeated an 8,000-man Egyptian relief force at Sheikan. In these actions, the Ansar overcame an earlier aversion to the use of European weaponry (guns).

To the west, the Mahdist uprising was able to count on existing resistance movements. The Turkish rule of Darfur had been resented by locals, and several rebels had already begun revolts. Baggara rebels under Rizeigat chief Madibo (Madibbu 'Ali) pledged themselves to the Mahdi and besieged Darfur's Governor-General Rudolf Carl von Slatin, an Austrian in the khedive's service, at Dara. Slatin's dhimmi religion already depressed morale amongst his men, and his chief lieutenant had married a close relation to the Mahdi. Slatin was captured in 1883, and more Darfuri tribes consequently joined the revolutionaries. Mahdist forces soon took control of most of Darfur. At first, the regime change was very popular in Darfur.

The Mahdiya's consistent military success also helped consolidate Ahmad's power. Following the battle at Sheikan, he ordered all Sufi orders under his control to disband, lest they divide the Ansar ideologically.

The advance of the Ansar and the Hadendowa rising in the east imperiled communications with Egypt and threatened to cut off garrisons at Khartoum, Kassala, Sennar, and Suakin and in the south. To avoid being drawn into a costly military intervention, the British government ordered an Egyptian withdrawal from Sudan. Gordon, who had received a reappointment as governor general, arranged to supervise the evacuation of Egyptian troops and officials and all foreigners from Sudan.

=== Conquest of Khartoum ===
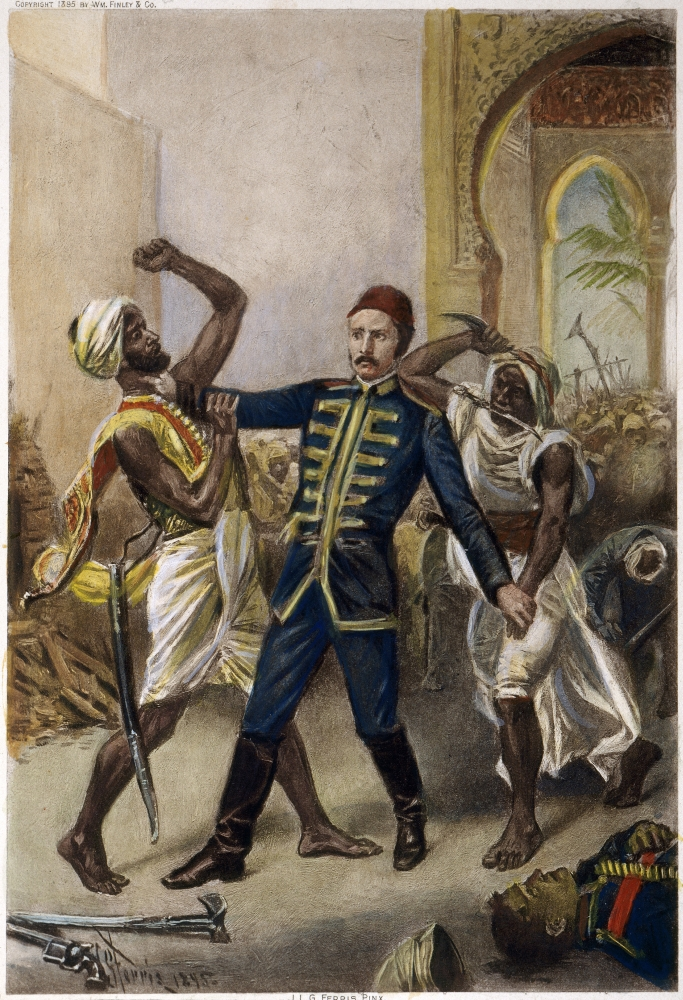
"Death of General Gordon at Khartoum", by J.L.G. Ferris

The defeat of the Dervishes at Toski

After reaching Khartoum in February 1884, Gordon soon decided he could not extricate the garrisons, and called for reinforcements. The British government repeatedly refused to provide them, but Gordon disobeyed orders, preparing for a siege, and eventually British popular support forced Prime Minister Gladstone to mobilize a relief force under the command of Lord Garnet Joseph Wolseley. The force arrived too late: the first troops on steamboat reached Khartoum on 28 January 1885, to find the town had fallen two days earlier. The Ansar had waited for the Nile flood to recede before attacking the poorly defended river approach to Khartoum in boats, slaughtering the garrison, killing Gordon, and delivering his head to the Mahdi's tent. Kassala and Sennar fell soon after, and by the end of 1885, the Ansar had begun to move into the southern region. In all of Sudan, only Sawakin, reinforced by Indian army troops, and Wadi Halfa on the northern frontier remained in Anglo-Egyptian hands.

The Mahdists destroyed Ottoman Khartoum, building a new capital across the river at Omdurman. All buildings were demolished and ransacked; when the British rebuilt the town 15 years later, no Ottoman-style architecture remained. The newly-captured wealth may have wrought a change in Mahdist standards of behavior: according to his enemies, "publicly [the Mahdi] continued to urge moderation on his followers, but in private he indulged in Turkish sensualities." His companions may have behaved similarly. Certainly, the Mahdist administration responded to its new finances. The beit al-māl, or public treasury, began to disburse funds to the poor, becoming a social services organization. Those women captured in the siege who had surviving male relatives or husbands were released to the same, but the many captives without a male guardian addled the Mahdist ideal of female seclusion. The Mahdi prescribed that they should be "married", and himself took three wives.

The Mahdi also struggled to delegate responsibilities. Justice was slow, as court decisions required his personal approval; and he continued to command his officers in the field even as he fell ill.

=== Abdallahi ibn Muhammad ===
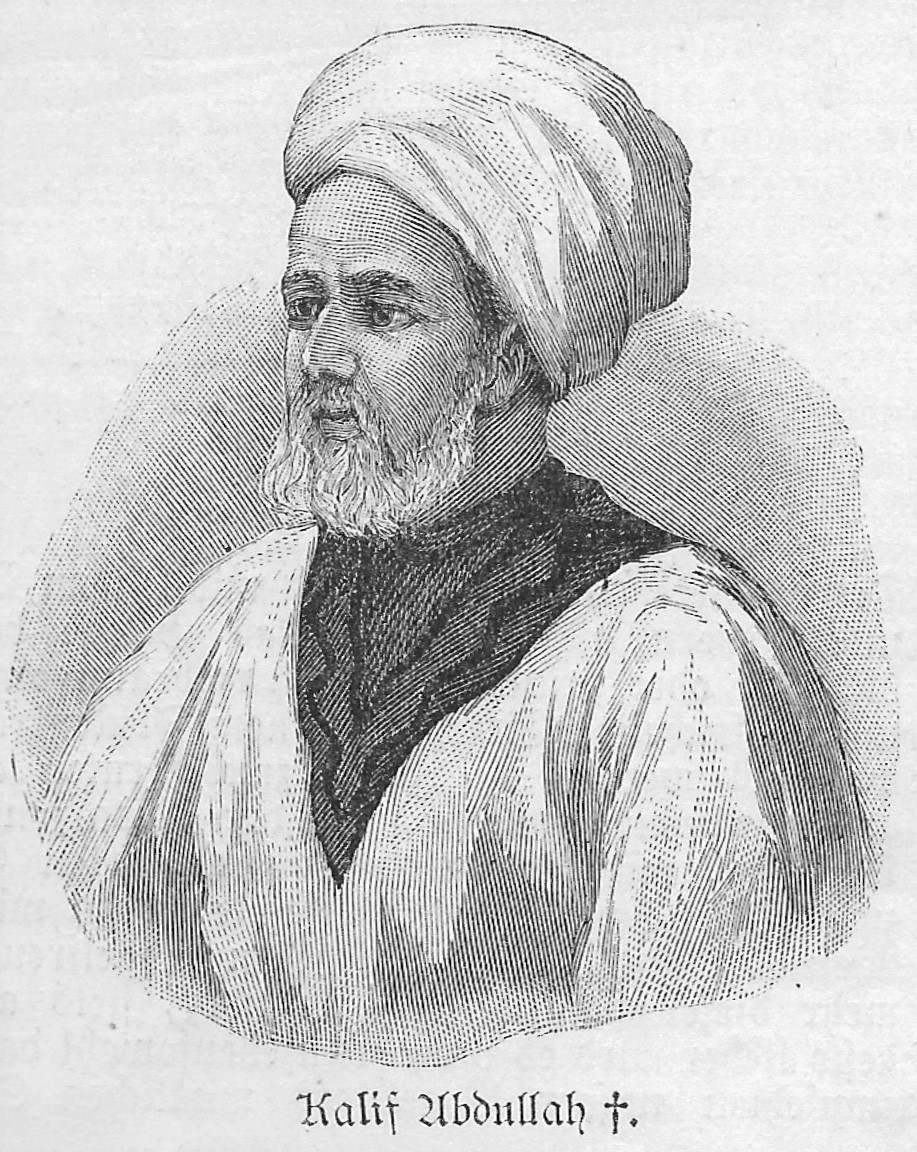
Abdallahi ibn Muhammad

Six months after the capture of Khartoum, the Mahdi died, probably of typhus (22 June 1885). The task of establishing and maintaining a government fell to his deputies—three caliphs chosen by the Mahdi in emulation of the Islamic prophet Muhammad. Rivalry among the three had begun even before the Mahdi's death, when he had unequivocally favored Abdallahi ibn Muhammad as his wazir over members of his own clan. Nevertheless, the three caliphs, each supported by people of his native region, continued to jockey until 1891, when Abdallahi achieved unchallenged supremacy, with the help primarily of the Baqqara Arabs.

Abdallahi's new rule demanded a legitimating principle. Some of the Mahdiya's new conquests still hoped for a return of Turkish rule; others were rapidly alienated by increasing autocracy; and yet others claimed themselves new divinely-inspired prophets. Abdallahi—now called the Khalifa (successor)—could not unite his followers against foreigners, as the foreigners had already been defeated and expulsed. The Khalifa was too illiterate to present himself as another prophet; and the elites in other tribes owed him no personal loyalty. Quickly, he purged the Mahdiyah of the Mahdi's family and many of his early religious disciples. But he remained wary, and even the slightest hint of disloyalty in a tribe could spark genocidal reprisals. Abdallahi's massacre of the grain-farming Juhaina tribe strained Sudan's food supply, and then an 1888 drought broke it entirely. Sudan fell into famine, even as it continued wars of conquest.

Regional relations remained tense throughout much of the Mahdiyah period, largely because of the Khalifa's commitment to using jihad to extend his version of Islam throughout the world. For example, the Khalifa rejected an offer of an alliance against the Europeans by Emperor Yohannes IV of Ethiopia (1871–1889). In 1887, a 60,000-man Ansar army invaded Ethiopia, penetrated as far as Gondar, and captured prisoners and booty. The Khalifa then refused to conclude peace with Ethiopia. In March 1889, an Ethiopian force, commanded by the emperor, marched on Metemma; however, after Yohannes fell in the ensuing Battle of Gallabat, the Ethiopians withdrew. Overall, the war with Ethiopia mostly wasted the Mahdists' resources. Abd ar Rahman an Nujumi, the Khalifa's best general, invaded Egypt in 1889, but British-led Egyptian troops defeated the Ansar at Tushkah. The failure of the Egyptian invasion ended the myth of the Ansars' invincibility. The Belgians prevented the Mahdi's men from conquering Equatoria, and in 1893, the Italians repulsed an Ansar attack at Akordat (in Eritrea) and forced the Ansar to withdraw from Ethiopia.

As the Mahdist government became more stable and well-organized, it began to implement taxes and implement its policies throughout its territories. This negatively impacted its popularity in much of Sudan, as many locals had joined the Mahdists to gain autonomy while removing a centralist and oppressive government. In Darfur, rebellions against Abdallahi ibn Muhammad's rule broke out because he was ordering Darfurians to migrate north to better defend the Mahdist State, while favoring the Baggara over other Darfurian ethnicities in regards to government positions. The main resistance was led by religious leader Abu Jimeiza of the Tama tribe in western Darfur. The opposition to the Mahdist government was also fuelled by many Mahdists behaving arrogantly and abusive towards the locals. Several states bordering the Mahdist State to the west began to provide the Darfurian rebels with troops and other support. Faced with a growing number of rebels, the Mahdist rule in Darfur gradually collapsed. The Mahdist era became known as the umkowakia in Darfur—the "period of chaos and anarchy".

=== Anglo-Egyptian reconquest of Sudan ===
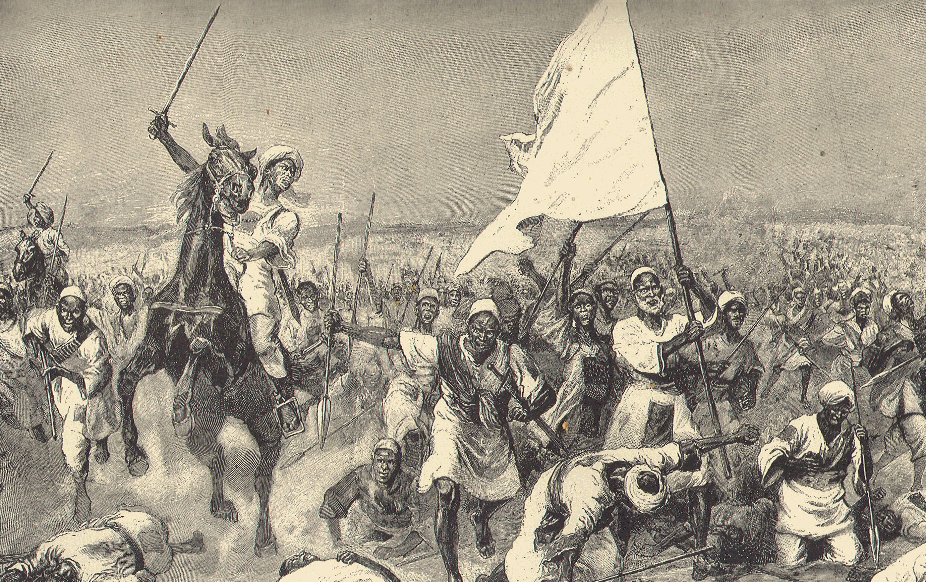
Charging Mahdist army

In 1892, Herbert Kitchener (later Lord Kitchener) became sirdar, or commander, of the Egyptian army and started preparations for the reconquest of Sudan. The British thought they needed to occupy Sudan in part because of international developments. By the early 1890s, British, French, and Belgian claims had converged at the Nile headwaters. Britain feared that the other colonial powers would take advantage of Sudan's instability to acquire territory previously annexed to Egypt. Apart from these political considerations, Britain wanted to establish control over the Nile to safeguard a planned irrigation dam at Aswan.

In 1895, the British government authorized Kitchener to launch a campaign to reconquer Sudan. Britain provided men and materiel while Egypt financed the expedition. The Anglo-Egyptian Nile Expeditionary Force included 25,800 men, 8,600 of whom were British. The remainder were troops belonging to Egyptian units that included six battalions recruited in southern Sudan. An armed river flotilla escorted the force, which also had artillery support. In preparation for the attack, the British established an army headquarters at the former rail head Wadi Halfa and extended and reinforced the perimeter defenses around Sawakin. In March 1896, the campaign started as the Dongola Expedition. Despite taking the time to reconstruct Ishma'il Pasha's former 3 ft 6 in (1,067 mm) gauge railway south along the east bank of the Nile, Kitchener captured the former capital of Nubia by September. The next year, the British constructed a new rail line directly across the desert from Wadi Halfa to Abu Hamad, which they captured in the Battle of Abu Hamed on 7 August 1897. (The 3 ft 6 in (1,067 mm) gauge, hastily adopted to make use of available rolling stock, meant supplies from the Egyptian network required transshipment via steamer from Asyut to Wadi Halfa. The Sudanese system retains the incompatible gauge to this day.) Anglo-Egyptian units fought a sharp action at Abu Hamad, but there was little other significant resistance until Kitchener reached Atbarah and defeated the Ansar. After this engagement, Kitchener's soldiers marched and sailed toward Omdurman, where the Khalifa made his last stand.

On 2 September 1898, the Khalifa committed his 52,000-man army to a frontal assault against the Anglo-Egyptian force, which was massed on the plain outside Omdurman. The outcome was never in doubt, largely because of superior British firepower. During the five-hour battle, about 11,000 Mahdists died, whereas Anglo-Egyptian losses amounted to 48 dead and fewer than 400 wounded.

Mopping-up operations required several years, but organized resistance ended when the Khalifa, who had escaped to Kordufan, died in fighting at Umm Diwaykarat in November 1899. Although the Khalifa had retained considerable support until his death, many areas welcomed the downfall of his regime. Sudan's economy had been all but destroyed during his reign and the population had declined by approximately one-half because of famine, disease, persecution, and warfare. Before the revolt, roughly 8 million people lived in Sudan; an Egyptian census afterwards recorded barely 2.5 million. Moreover, none of the country's traditional institutions or loyalties remained intact. Tribes had been divided in their attitudes toward Mahdism, religious brotherhoods had been weakened, and orthodox religious leaders had vanished.

=== Holdouts and legacy ===
Even though the Mahdist State factually ceased to exist after Umm Diwaykarat, some Mahdist holdouts continued to persist. One officer, Osman Digna, continued to resist the Anglo-Egyptian forces until captured in January 1900. However, the most long-lasting Mahdist holdouts survived in Darfur, despite the fact that Mahdist rule had already been collapsing there before the Anglo-Egyptian reconquest. The holdouts were concentrated at Kabkabiya (led by Sanin Husain), Dar Taaisha (led by Arabi Dafalla), and Dar Masalit (led by Sultan Abuker Ismail). The reestablished Sultanate of Darfur consequently had to crush the Mahdist loyalists in a series of lengthy wars. The Kabkabiya holdout under Sanin Husain persisted until 1909, when it was destroyed by the Sultanate of Darfur after a siege of 17 or 18 months.

The Mahdi's direct family did not participate in the Mahdist resistance, and instead regained substantial power during the remaining British occupation. A descendant of his would win 1986 Sudanese parliamentary elections, the most recent fair and free elections as of 2024, mainly on the support of the (modern) Ansar.

== The Mahdiyah ==
The Mahdiyah (Mahdist regime) has become known as the first genuine Sudanese nationalist government. However, the Mahdi maintained that his movement was not a religious order that could be accepted or rejected at will, but that it was a universal regime, which challenged man to join or to be destroyed. The state's administration was first properly organized under Khalifa Abdallahi ibn Muhammad who attempted to use the Islamic law to unify the different peoples of Sudan. However, Khalifa Abdallahi maintained several commonalities with the (disorganized) regime of his predecessor.

The Mahdist regime imposed traditional Sharia law. Zakat (almsgiving) became the tax paid to the state, a significant portion of which was allocated towards sustaining the extravagant lifestyles of the movement's leaders. The Mahdi outlawed foreign innovations, including Western medicine, and expelled all doctors. His government reluctantly incorporated foreign military technology, and initially staffed itself with Ashraf and Copts only for lack of any other literate officials. Later, it severely persecuted Christians in Sudan, including Copts. Ottoman vices, including snuff and alcohol (the latter forbidden in Islam) were all part of contemporary Sudanese culture; the Mahdist regime acted to strictly prohibit them. The Ottoman fez was also forbidden.

The Khalifa instituted appointed Ansar (usually Baqqara) as amirs over each of the several provinces. Borderland provinces were under martial law, while internal provinces funded military expenditures. The Khalifa also ruled over rich Al Jazirah. Although he failed to restore this region's commercial wellbeing, the Khalifa organized workshops to manufacture ammunition and to maintain river steamboats.

The Mahdi modified Islam's five pillars to support the dogma that loyalty to him was essential to true belief. The Mahdi also added the declaration "and Muhammad Ahmad is the Mahdi of God and the representative of His Prophet" to the recitation of the creed, the shahada. The government enforced mandatory salah, and also required twice-daily recitation of the Mahdi's rātib, or prayerbook. After the Mahdi's death, the Khalifa attempted to argue that a visit to his tomb replaced the hajj pilgrimage to Mecca. The Mahdi justified these as responses to instructions conveyed to him by God in visions.

== Military ==
=== Army ===
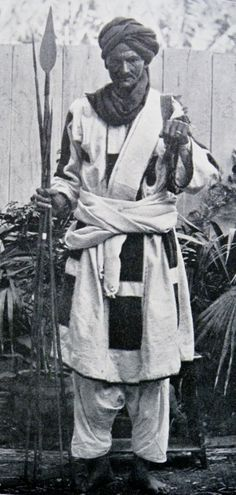
A Mahdist soldier wearing a jibba (1899).

The Mahdist State had a large military which became increasingly professional as time went on. From an early point, the Mahdist armies recruited defectors from the Egyptian Army and organized professional soldiers in the form of the jihadiya, mostly Black Sudanese. These were supported by tribal spearmen and swordsmen as well as cavalry. The jihadiya and some tribal units lived in military barracks, while the rest were more akin to militia. The Mahdist armies also possessed limited artillery, including mountain guns and even machine guns. However, these were few in numbers, and thus only used as defenses for important towns and to the river steamers that acted as the state's navy. In general, the Mahdist armies were highly motivated by their belief system. Exploiting this, the Mahdist commanders used their riflemen to screen charges by their melee infantry and cavalry. Such attacks often proved effective, but also led to extremely high losses when employed "unimaginatively". The Europeans generally called the Mahdist soldiers "dervishes".

Muhammad Ahmad's early insurgent force which was mostly recruited among the poor Arab communities living at the Nile. The later armies of the Mahdiyah were recruited among various groups, including mostly autonomous groups such as the Beja people. The early forces of the Mahdi were termed the "ansar", and divided into three units led by a Khalifa. These units were termed raya ("flags") in accordance to their standards. The "Black Flag" was mostly recruited from western Sudanese, mainly Baggara, and commanded by Abdallahi ibn Muhammad. The "Red Flag" was led by Muhammad al-Sharif and mostly consisted of riverine recruits from the north. The "Green Flag" under Ali Hilu included troops drawn from the southern tribes living between the White and Blue Nile. After the Mahdi's death, the command of the "Black Flag" was passed to Abdallahi ibn Muhammad's brother Yaqub and became the state's main army, based at the capital Omdurman. As the Mahdist State expanded, provincial commanders raised new armies with separate standards which were modelled on the main armies. The most elite forces within the Mahdist armies were the Mulazimiyya, Abdallahi ibn Muhammad's bodyguards. Commanded by Uthman Shaykh al-Din, these were based at the capital and 10,000 strong, most armed with rifles.

The "flags" were further divided into rubs ("quarters") consisting of 800 to 1200 fighters. In turn, rubs were split into four sections, one administrative, one jihadiya, one sword- and spear-wielding infantry, and one cavalry. The jihadiya units were further split into "standards" of 100 led by officers known as ra's mi'a, and into muqaddamiyya of 25 under muqaddam.

=== Navy ===
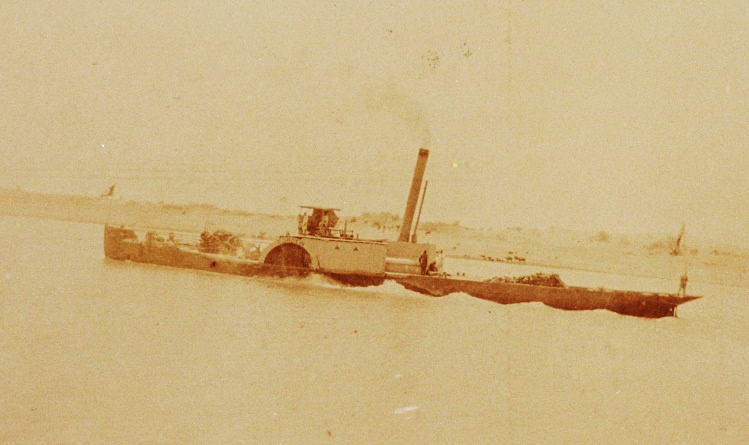
The Mahdist State fielded a brown-water navy, including captured steamboats like the Bordein (pictured in 1900).

The Mahdist navy emerged during the early rebellion, as the insurgents took control of boats operating on the Nile. In May 1884, the Mahdists captured the steamboats Fasher and Musselemieh, followed by the Muhammed Ali and Ismailiah. In addition, several armed steamboats which had been supposed to aid Charles Gordon's besieged force were wrecked and abandoned in 1885. At least two of these, the Bordein and Safia, were salvaged by the Mahdists. (Note: According to Roger Branfill-Cook, the Mahdists also salvaged the Talahawiyeh (also known as Tel El-Hoween) and Tawfiqiyeh, but Angus Konstam argued that there is no evidence that either vessel was salvaged, with remnants of the Talahawiyeh still visible in 1909, reportedly where it had sunk under Anglo-Egyptian service.) The captured steamboats were armed with light artillery pieces, and crewed by Egyptians as well as Sudanese. The Mahdist navy also used supply ships.

In October 1898, parts of the Mahdist navy were sent up the White Nile to assist the expedition against Emin Pasha's forces. The Ismailiah was sunk on 17 August 1898 as it was placing naval mines on the Nile near Omdurman to block the advance of British gunboats. One mine accidentally exploded, destroying the ship. The Safia and Tawfiqiyeh, towing barges with 2,000 to 3,000 soldiers, were sent up the Blue Nile against French forces holding Fashoda on 25 August 1898. There, the two ships attacked the fort, but the Safia broke down and was exposed to heavy fire before being towed to safety by the Tawfiqiyeh. The Tawfiqiyeh subsequently retreated to Omdurman, but encountered a large Anglo-Egyptian fleet on the way and surrendered. The Mahdist navy fought its last battle on 11 or 15 September 1898, when the Anglo-Egyptian gunboat Sultan encountered the Safia near Reng. The two ships fought a short battle, and the Safia was badly damaged before being boarded and captured. The Bordein was eventually captured when Omdurman fell to the Anglo-Egyptian forces.

=== Uniform ===
At the start of his insurgency, the Mahdi encouraged his followers to wear similar clothing in form of the jibba. As a result, the core army of the Mahdi and Abdallahi ibn Muhammad had a relatively regulated appearance from an early point. In contrast, other armies of supporters and allies initially did not adopt the jibba and maintained their traditional appearances. Riverine forces recruited from the Ja'alin tribe and the Danagla mostly wore simple white robes (tobe). The Beja also did not adopt the jibba until 1885.

As time went on and the Mahdist State became better organized under Khalifa Abdallahi ibn Muhammad's leadership, its armies became more and more professional. By the 1890s factories in Omdurman and provincial centers were mass-producing jibba to provide the troops with clothing. Although the jibba still varied in their style, with certain tribes and armies favoring certain patterns and colors, the Mahdist forces became increasingly professional in appearance. The jibba also indicated a fighter's rank within the Mahdist armies. Lower-ranking commanders (emirs) wore more colorful and elaborate jibba. The most senior military leadership preferred the most simple designs, however, to indicate their piety. The Khalifa wore plain white. Some Mahdist troops possessed mail armour, helmets, and quilted coats, although these were more often used in parades than in combat. One unit within the Mahdist armies, the Mulazimiyya, adopted a full uniform, as all their members wore identical white-red-blue jibba.

=== Flags ===
The Mahdist State and its armies had no uniform flags, but still used certain designs repeatedly. Most flags carried four lines of Arabic texts which signified allegiance to God, Muhammad, and the Mahdi. The flags were usually white with colored borders, and the text displayed in varying colors. Most military units had their own individual flags.

== See also ==
- History of Sudan
- Mahdist War
- In Desert and Wilderness (novel)
- Millenarianism in colonial societies
