= Abdallahi ibn Muhammad =

Sudanese Ansar ruler (1846–1899)

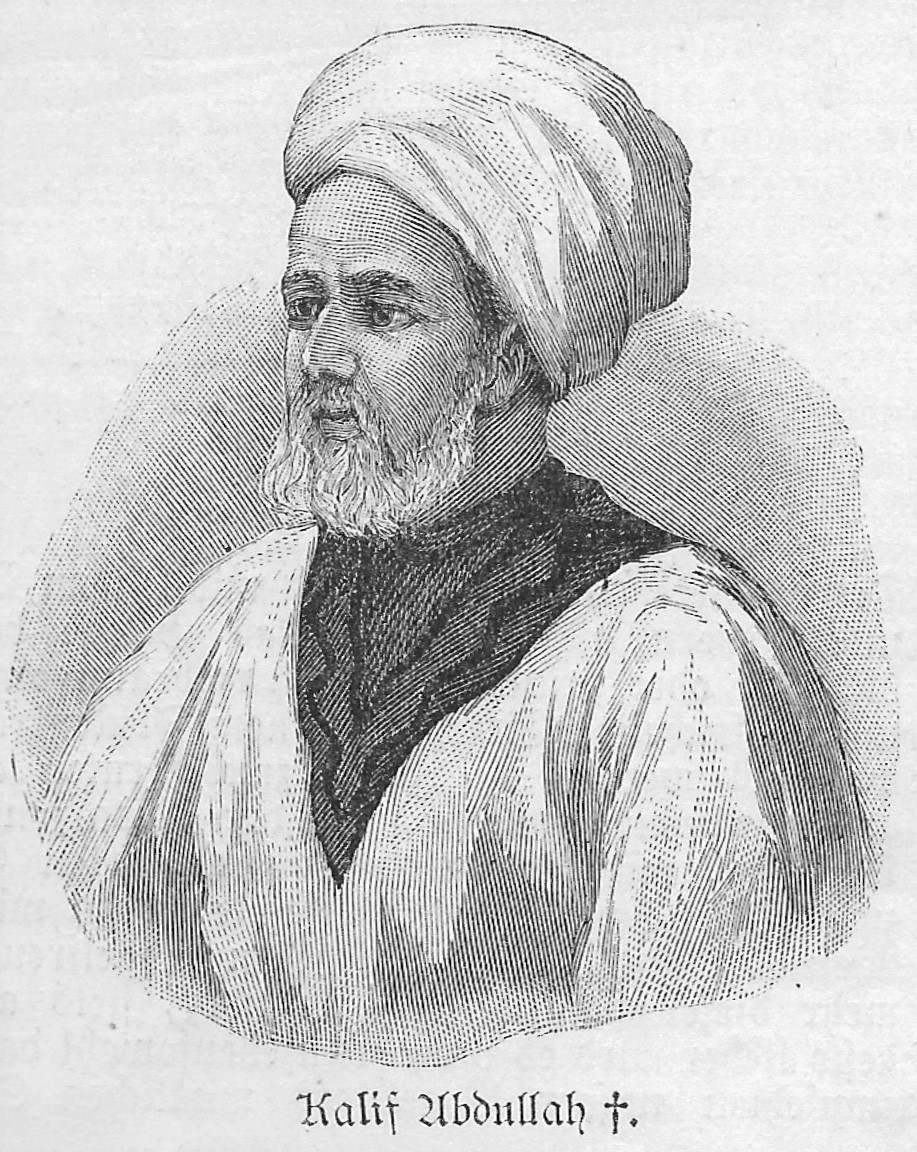
- Artistic representation of Abdallahi ibn Muhammad

Caliph of Sudan
- Reign: 1885–1899
- Predecessor: Muhammad Ahmad (as Mahdi)
- Successor: Disestablished
- Born: c. 1846; Um Dafuq, Darfur, Turco-Egyptian Sudan, Egypt Eyalet
- Died: 25 November 1899 (age 53); Umm Diwaykarat, Mahdist Sudan
Names
- Abdullah Ibn Muhammad Al-Khalifa

Abdullah ibn-Mohammed al-Khalifa or Abdullah al-Taashi or Abdallah al-Khalifa, also known as "The Khalifa" (Arabic: c. عبدالله بن سيد محمد الخليفة; 1846 – 25 November 1899) was a Sudanese Ansar ruler who was one of the principal followers of Muhammad Ahmad. Ahmad claimed to be the Mahdi, building up a large following. After Ahmad's death, Abdullah ibn-Mohammed took over the movement, adopting the title of Khalifah al-Mahdi (usually rendered as "Khalifa"). He attempted to create a kingdom, which led to widespread discontent and his eventual defeat and death at the hands of the British and Egyptians.

== Personal life ==
Abdullah was born into the Ta'aisha Baqqara tribe c. 1846 in Um Dafuq and was trained and educated as a preacher and holy man. His father, Mahommed et Taki, had determined to emigrate to Mecca with his family, but the unsettled state of the region prevented him, and he died in Africa after advising Abdullah, to take refuge on the Nile, and to proceed to Mecca at a favourable opportunity.

On his journey, Abdullah met and became a follower of Muhammad Ahmad "the Mahdi" around 1880 and was named Khalifa by the Mahdi in 1881, becoming one of his chief lieutenants. He married Hafsa Abdelsalam; she eventually bore him a son.

The other Khalifas were Ali wad Hilu and Muhammad Sharif. Abdullah was given command of a large part of the Mahdist army, and during the next four years led them in a series of victories over the Anglo-Egyptians.

He fought at the Battle of El Obeid, where William Hicks's Anglo-Egyptian army was destroyed (5 November 1883), and was one of the principal commanders at the siege of Khartoum, (February 1884 – 26 January 1885).

== Ruler of Sudan ==
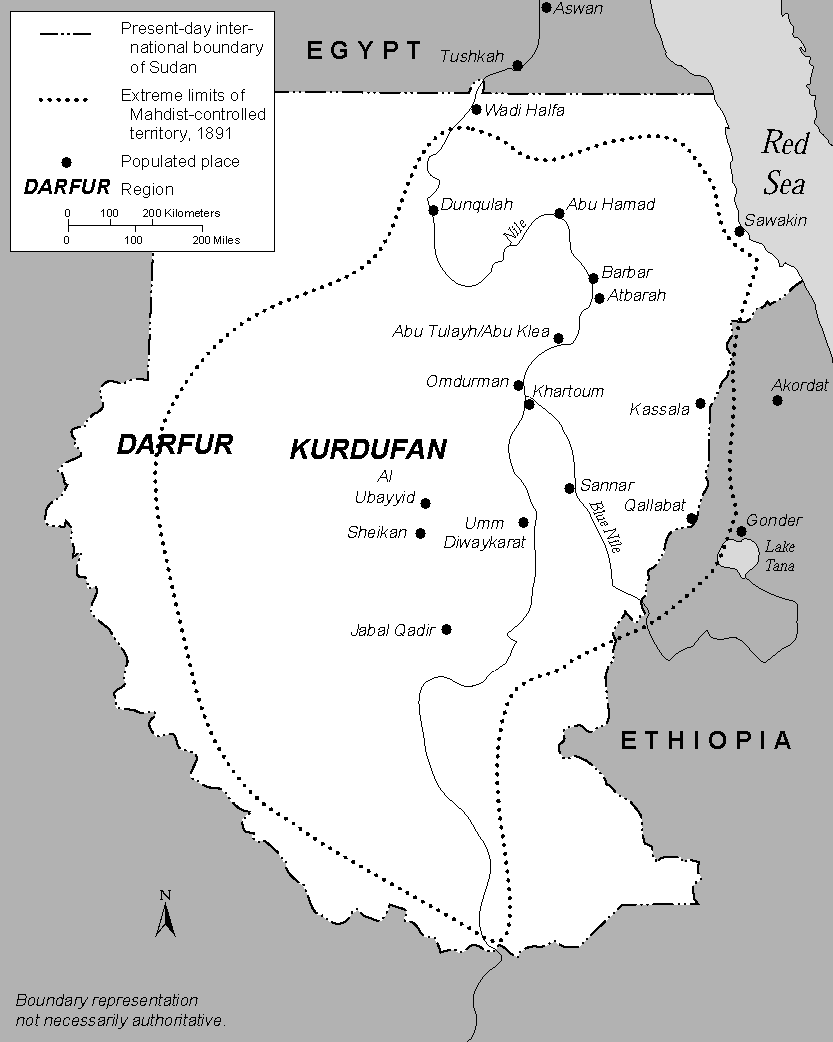
Abdallahi's 1891 empire

After the unexpected death of the Mahdi in June 1885, Abdullah succeeded as leader of the Mahdists, declaring himself "Khalifat al-Mahdi", or successor of the Mahdi. He faced internal disputes over his leadership with the Ashraf and he had to suppress several revolts during 1885–1886, 1888–1889, and 1891 before emerging as sole leader of the Mahdiyah or Mahdist State.

At first the Mahdiyah was run on military lines as a jihad state, with the courts enforcing Sharia law and the precepts of the Mahdi, which had equal force. Later the Khalifa established a more traditional administration. Khartoum was deserted on his orders, and Omdurman, at first intended as a temporary camp, was made his capital.

He felt the best course of action to keep internal problems to a minimum was to expand into Ethiopia and Egypt. The Khalifa invaded Ethiopia with 60,000 Ansar troops and sacked Gondar in 1887, destroying nearly every church in the city. He later refused to make peace. He successfully repulsed the Ethiopians at the Battle of Metemma on 9 March 1889, where the Ethiopian Emperor Yohannes IV was killed. He created workshops to maintain steam boats on the Nile and to manufacture ammunition. But the Khailfa underestimated the strength of the Anglo-Egyptian forces and suffered a crushing defeat in Egypt.

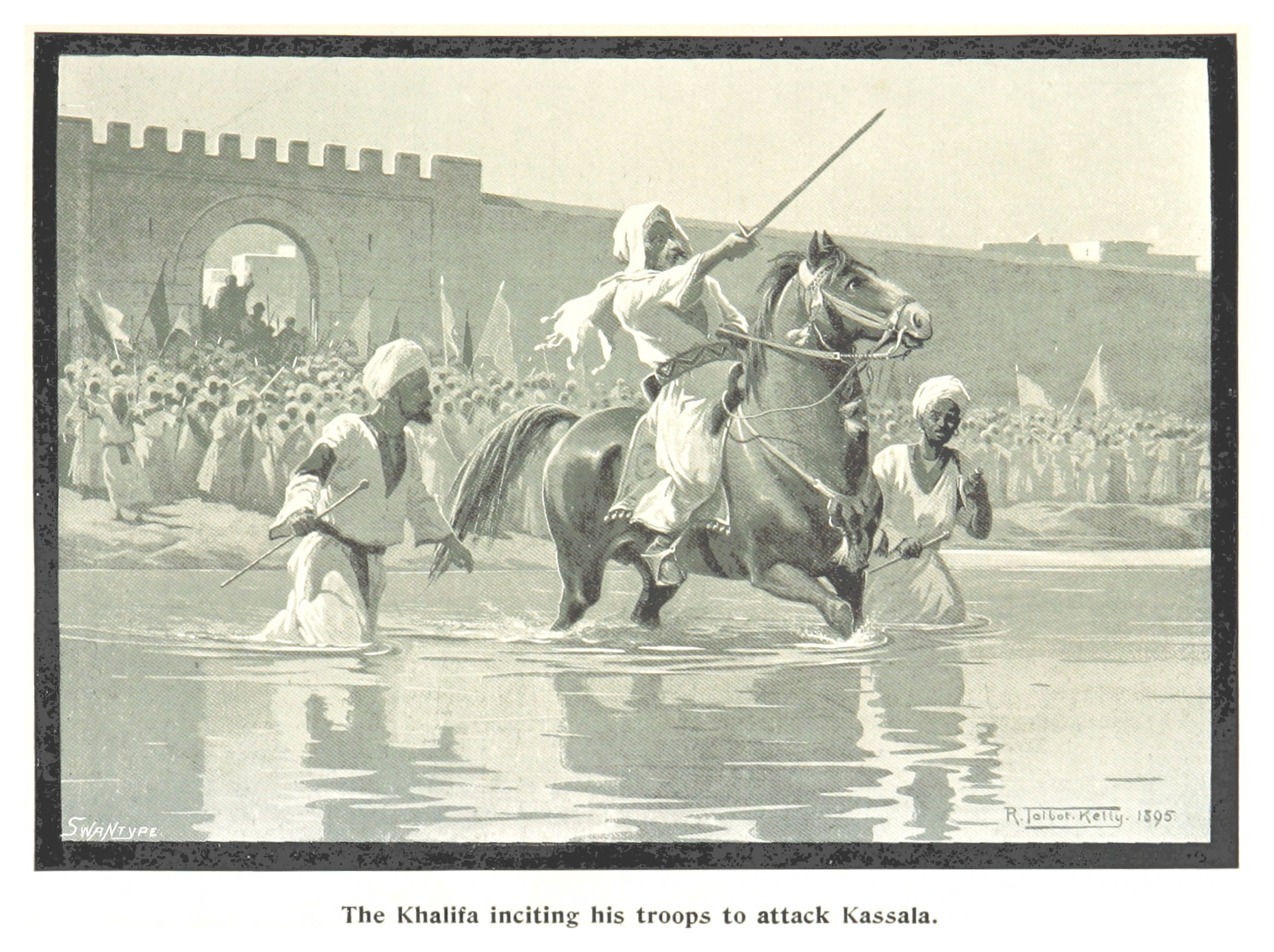
A depiction of the Khalifa inciting his troops to attack Kassala, from Rudolf Carl von Slatin's Fire and Sword in the Sudan (1896)

The Egyptians failed to counter up the Nile; however in the 1890s the state became strained economically, and suffered from crop failures instead. The Ashraf, in November 1891, decided to press again, but were put down one final time; they were prevented from causing any further issues. During the next four years, the Khalifa strengthened the military and financial situation of Sudan; however this was not enough, as Sudan became threatened by the Italian, French and British imperial forces that surrounded it. In 1896, an Anglo-Egyptian army under General Herbert Kitchener began the reconquest of Sudan.

== Defeat and death ==
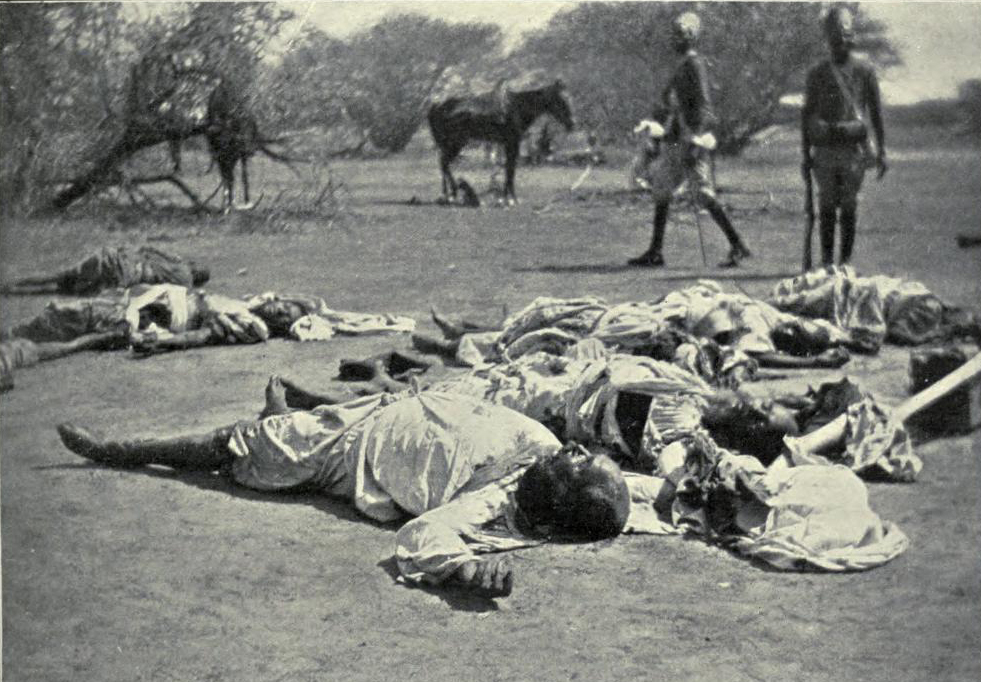
The body of the Khalifa (third from the right) on the battlefield of Umm Diwaykarat

Following the loss of Dongola in September 1896, then Berber and Abu Hamad to Kitchener's army in 1897, the Khalifa Abdullah sent an army that was defeated at the Battle of Atbara River on 8 April 1898, afterwards falling back to his new capital of Omdurman.

At the Battle of Omdurman on 2 September 1898, his army of 52,000 men was destroyed. The Khalifa then fled south and went into hiding with a few followers and was eventually caught and killed by Reginald Wingate's Egyptian column at Umm Diwaikarat in Kordofan on 25 November 1899.

Devout, intelligent, and an able general and administrator, the Khalifa was unable to overcome tribal dissension to unify Sudan, and was forced to employ Egyptians to provide the trained administrators and technicians he needed to maintain the Mahdist State.

== See also ==
- Anglo-Egyptian conquest of Sudan
- Khalifa House Museum
