= Korosko =

Settlement in Sudan

Coordinates: 22°36′23″N 2°19′23″E

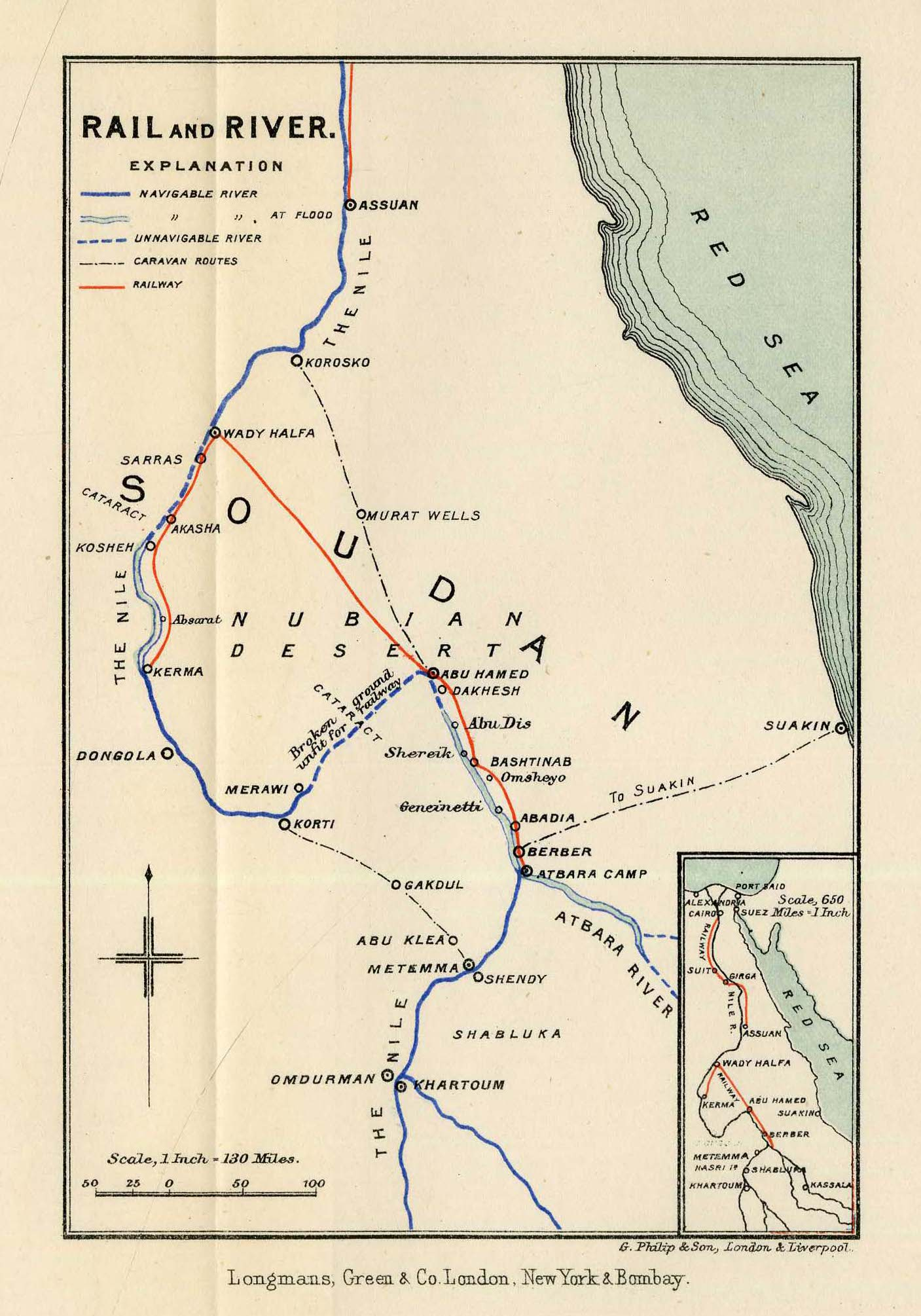
A map of 19th-century rail and caravan routes in Sudan—including Korosko—from Churchill's 1899 River War.

Korosko was a settlement on the Nile River in Egyptian Nubia. It was located 118 miles (190 km) south of Aswan and served as the point of departure for caravans avoiding the Dongola bend in the river by striking out directly across the desert to Abu Hamad and thereby bypassing the second, third and fourth cataracts of the Nile. The "Korosko route" or "Korosoko road" was in use during the period of the New Kingdom (1550–1077 BC), when Pharaohs Thutmose I and Thutmose III marked it with boundary stelae. During the Meroitic period it was the main connection between the Kingdom of Kush and the Mediterranean world.

Korosko was only replaced in this function by Wadi Halfa after the construction of the Sudan Military Railroad during the 1890s amid the Mahdi War. Although the railway employed a different gauge and was not connected to the Egyptian system, the two networks were connected directly by steamboat and Korosko, between them, diminished in importance.

Its former location was flooded by Lake Nasser upon the completion of the Aswan High Dam.

== See also ==
- The Tragedy of the Korosko, a novel by Arthur Conan Doyle
