= List of wars involving Sudan =

This is a list of wars involving the Republic of Sudan and its predecessors.

== Kingdom of Kush (780 BC – 350 AD) ==
Conflict	Combatant 1	Combatant 2	Results
Kushite-Assyrian Wars (673–663 BCE)	Kingdom of Kush	Neo-Assyrian Empire Twenty-sixth Dynasty of Egypt	Defeat

== Kingdom of Makuria (5th century AD – late 15th century) ==
Conflict	Combatant 1	Combatant 2	Results
First battle of Dongola (642)	Kingdom of Makuria	Rashidun Caliphate	Victory

Conflict	Combatant 1	Combatant 2	Results
Battle of Dongola (1276)	Kingdom of Makuria	Mamluk Sultanate	Defeat

== Funj Sultanate (1504–1841) ==
Conflict	Combatant 1	Combatant 2	Results
Battle of the Dindar River (1744)	Sennar	Solomonic Dynasty	Victory

== Mahdist Sudan (1881–1899) ==
Conflict	Combatant 1	Combatant 2	Results
Mahdist rebellion (1881–1885)	Mahdist State	United Kingdom • (British Raj) India • Egypt Italy: (Kingdom of Italy) Eritrea	Victory: Mahdists gain control of Sudan; Fall of Turco-Egyptian Sudan; Full British intervention in 1885
Mahdist War (1881–1899)	Mahdist State	United Kingdom • Egypt • India • Canada • Colony of New South Wales; Italy • (Kingdom of Italy) Colony of Eritrea; Ethiopia; Congo Free State	Defeat: Sudanese invasions of neighbours repelled; Britain and Egypt took over Sudan and turned it into a condominium known as the Anglo-Egyptian Sudan; Kassala temporarily occupied by Italy; Congo secures the Lado Enclave until 1910

== Colonial Sudan (1898–1956) ==
Conflict	Combatant 1	Combatant 2	Results
Wad Habuba Revolt (1908)	United Kingdom • Anglo-Egyptian Sudan	Mahdist rebels	Victory: Al-Qadir leaves to Omdurman on a donkey; Katifa bloodlessly recaptured by the British; Rebel attempts to recapture Katfia fail
Invasion of Darfur (1916)	United Kingdom • Anglo-Egyptian Sudan	Sultanate of Darfur; Senussi State	Victory: Sultanate of Darfur annexed into Anglo-Egyptian Sudan; Death of Ali Dinar

== Post-independence (from 1956) ==
Conflict	Combatant 1	Combatant 2	Results
South Sudanese wars of independence (1955–2005)	Sudan: Sudanese Armed Forces (SAF); Arab militias; Arab Tribes in Sudan	South Sudan: Anyanya; South Sudan People's Defence Forces; South Sudan Liberation Movement; Different Factions and splinter groups	Stalemate: Comprehensive Peace Agreement; Independence of the Republic of South Sudan following a 2011 referendum; Unresolved issues result in the Sudan–SPLM-N conflict, and the South Sudanese Civil War
First Sudanese Civil War (1955–1972)	(Egypt) Anglo-Egyptian Sudan (1955–1956); Republic of the Sudan (1956–1969); Democratic Republic of the Sudan (1969–1972); Combat support: Uganda (Joint operations on Ugandan territory, 1965–1969); Libyan Arab Republic (From 1969 and combat involvement at least in 1970); Non-combat support: United Arab Republic; Soviet Union; United Kingdom; China; Yugoslavia; East Germany; Czechoslovakia; Saudi Arabia; Kingdom of Libya (until 1969); Algeria; United States; West Germany	SDF mutineers, bandits, and unaffiliated separatist militias ALF (1965–1970); Anyanya (from 1963); Israel (from 1969); Supported by: Ethiopia; Uganda (from about 1970) (Democratic Republic of the Congo) Congo-Léopoldville; Kenya; France	Stalemate: Addis Ababa Agreement; Establishment of the Southern Sudan Autonomous Region with various defined powers
Lebanese Civil War (1976–1979)	(Arab League) ADF: Syria; Saudi Arabia; Sudan; UAE; Libya; South Yemen	LF	Withdrawal: End of ADF mandate following the Hundred Days' War
Iran–Iraq War (1982–1988)	Iraq; MEK; DRFLA; KDPI; Sudan	Iran; KDP; PUK; Badr Brigades	Stalemate: Both Iraq and Iran accepted UNSC Resolution 598
Second Sudanese Civil War (1983–2005)	Sudan: Armed Forces; PDF; Army of Peace; Muraheleen; (Rwanda) Ex-FAR and Interahamwe; SSDF; SPLA dissidents: SPLA-Nasir; SPLA-United; SSIM/A; Nuer White Army (Uganda) Ugandan insurgents: LRA; WNBF; UNRF (II); Zaire (1994–1997) al-Qaeda (1991–1996); Iraq (Note: Iraqi support for Sudan during the war mostly consisted of weapons shipments; according to the South Sudanese, however, at least one unit of Iraqi paratroopers fought alongside the SAF near Juba. About 200 Iraqi soldiers were allegedly killed, and the site of their remains became known as "Jebel Iraqi". The International Institute for Strategic Studies also stated that Iraqi forces fought alongside Sudanese government troops.); China (Note: Although China was not officially involved in the war, it sent troops to the country in order to protect oil fields and thereby aid the Sudanese military. China also provided Sudan with weaponry.) Combat aid: Libya (1986–1991); DR Congo (1998–2003) Non-combat aid: Iran; Belarus (from 1996)	SPLA: SPLA-Mainstream; SPLA-Agar; SPDF; ALF; Titweng; SSLM; NDA; Sudanese Alliance Forces; Anyanya II; Eastern Coalition; Derg (until 1987); PDR Ethiopia (1987–1991); FDR Ethiopia (1995–1998); Eritrea (1996–1998, 2002–2005); Uganda (from 1993); Non-combat aid: Libya (1983–1985); Israel; Cuba (until 1991)	Stalemate: Comprehensive Peace Agreement; Eastern Sudan Peace Agreement; Independence of the Republic of South Sudan following a 2011 referendum; Unresolved issues result in the Sudan–SPLM-N conflict, and the South Sudanese Civil War
First Congo War (1996–1997)	Zaire: FAZ; White Legion; Sudan; Chad (Rwanda) Ex-FAR/ALiR; Interahamwe; CNDD-FDD; UNITA; ADF; FLNC; Supported by: France; Central African Republic; China; Israel; Kuwait (denied) Mai-Mai (Note: Many Mai-Mai militias in eastern Zaire initially allied themselves with Rwanda and the AFDL against Hutu militants and refugees. As soon as most Hutu were driven away, however, many Mai-Mai groups turned against Rwanda and the AFDL. Despite this, some anti-Hutu Mai-Mai remained allied with Rwanda and the AFDL.)	(Democratic Republic of the Congo) AFDL; Rwanda; Uganda; Burundi; Angola (South Sudan) SPLA; Eritrea; Supported by: South Africa; Zambia; Zimbabwe; Ethiopia; Tanzania; United States (covertly) Mai-Mai	AFDL victory: Overthrow of the Mobutu regime; Zaire renamed back to the Democratic Republic of the Congo; Installation of Laurent-Désiré Kabila as president; Beginning of Second Congo War
War in Darfur (2003–2020)	Sudan: SAF; Janjaweed; RSF; Chadian rebel groups Anti-Gaddafi forces (2011); Supported by: Libya (2011–2020); China; Iran (until 2016); Russia; Belarus; Syria (2000s, alleged)	SRF (Note: Known as the National Redemption Front prior to 2011.) (2006–2020): JEM (2003–2020); SLA (some factions) (2003–2020); LJM (2010–11) (Note: Signed the Doha Darfur Peace Agreement in 2011.); SLA (some factions); SARC (2014–2020); SLFA (2017–2020): SLA-Unity; SLMJ; JEM (Jali); Supported by: South Sudan; Chad (2005–2010); Eritrea (until 2008); Libya (until 2011); Uganda (until 2015) (United Nations) UNAMID (2007–2020)	Stalemate: Intertwined with the Sudanese conflict in South Kordofan and Blue Nile (Until 2020); Comprehensive peace agreement signed with most rebel groups; Darfur Peace Agreement
Invasion of Anjouan (2008)	African Union: Comoros; Senegal; Sudan; Tanzania; Supported by: France (logistical support); Libyan Arab Jamahiriya (logistical support); United States	Anjouan	Victory: Mohamed Bacar flees to Mayotte; Autonomous government of Anjouan is replaced
War in South Kordofan (2011–2020)	Sudan	SRF (until 2020): JEM; SPLM–N; SLA; Alleged support: Ethiopia	Stalemate: Comprehensive peace agreement signed between some rebel factions and the transitional government; Strongest rebel faction in South Kordofan and Blue Nile refused to sign peace deal
Heglig Crisis (2012)	Sudan	South Sudan; JEM SPLM-N	Victory: South Sudanese withdrawal from Heglig; Agreement on borders and natural resources signed on 26 September
Saudi-led intervention in Yemen (2015–present)	(Yemen) Hadi government (South Yemen) Southern Movement; Saudi Arabia; United Arab Emirates; Bahrain; South Korea; Kuwait; Qatar; Jordan; Morocco; Sudan; Egypt; Senegal	(Yemen) Houthi government	Ongoing: Houthis dissolve Yemeni government; Houthis take control of northern Yemen
Al-Fashaga conflict (2020–2022)	Sudan	(Amhara Region) Amhara militias Alleged: Ethiopia; Eritrea	Sudanese military victory: Status quo ante bellum; Disengagement and de-escalation; Sudan recaptures all of the border territory with Ethiopia.; Sudan and Ethiopia agree to settle all disputes peacefully.
Sudanese civil war (2023–present)	Sudanese government; Sudanese Armed Forces; PDF; Popular Resistance; Al-Bara Battalion; AWB; SPLM-N (Agar); JEM; SLM (Minnawi); SLM (Tambour) (from August 2023); Darfur Joint Protection Force (from November 2023); Egypt; Supported by: Ukraine; Turkey; Iran; Saudi Arabia	(Sudan) Government of Peace and Unity (from April 2025); Rapid Support Forces; Non-RSF Janjaweed militias; SPLM-N (al-Hilu) (from February 2025); Tamazuj (from August 2023); Libyan National Army; Desert Wolves; Supported by: United Arab Emirates (Russia) Wagner Group; Chad (alleged) SLM (al-Nur) SPLM-N (al-Hilu) (June 2023 – February 2025)	Ongoing: Rapid Support Forces occupy most of Darfur, and parts of Kordofan.; SPLM-N (al-Hilu) occupies parts of South Kordofan.; SLM (al-Nur) control parts of Darfur; Sudanese Armed Forces retake the Khartoum area by 20 May 2025.; Sudanese Armed Forces retain control of northern, eastern, and central areas of the country.

== See also ==
- East African Campaign (World War II)

== Bibliography ==
First Sudanese Civil War:

- Assefa, Hizkias. 1987. Mediation of Civil Wars, Approaches and Strategies – The Sudan Conflict. Boulder, Colorado: Westview Press.
- Eprile, Cecil. War and Peace in the Sudan, 1955 – 1972. David and Charles, London. 1974. ISBN 0-7153-6221-6.
- Johnson, Douglas H. 1979. "Book Review: The Secret War in the Sudan: 1955–1972 by Edgar O'Ballance". African Affairs 78 (310):132–7.
- O'Ballance, Edgar. 1977. The Secret War in the Sudan: 1955–1972. Hamden, Connecticut: Archon Books. (Faber and Faber edition ISBN 0-571-10768-0).
- Poggo, Scopas Sekwat. 1999. War and Conflict in Southern Sudan, 1955–1972. PhD Dissertation, University of California, Santa Barbara.

== Sources ==
- Bassil, Noah (2013). The Post-Colonial State and Civil War in Sudan: The Origins of Conflict in Darfur. London; New York: I.B. Tauris. ISBN 978-1780760858.
- Connell, Dan (August 1998). "Sudan: Global Trade, Local Impact. Arms Transfers to all Sides in the Civil War in Sudan" (PDF). Human Rights Watch. 10 (4 (A)).
- Debos, Marielle (2016) [1st pub. 2013]. Living by the Gun in Chad. Combatants, Impunity and State Formation. Translated by Andrew Brown (Revised, Updated, and Translated ed.). London: Zed Books. ISBN 978-1-78360-532-3.
- DeRouen, Karl R.; Heo, Uk (2007). Civil wars of the world: major conflicts since World War II. Vol. 1. ABC-CLIO.
- de Waal, Alex (April 2007). "Sudan: international dimensions to the state and its crisis" (PDF). Occasional Papers (Crisis States Research Centre) (2). ISSN 1753-3082.
- Khalid, Mansour (2010) [1st pub. 2003]. War & Peace in the Sudan. London; New York: Routledge. ISBN 978-0-7103-0663-0.
- LeRiche, Matthew; Arnold, Matthew (2013). South Sudan: From Revolution to Independence. Oxford: Oxford University Press. ISBN 978-0-19-933340-0.
- Leopold, Mark (2001). "'Trying to Hold Things Together?' International NGOs caught up in an Emergency in North-Western Uganda, 1996–97". In Ondine Barrow; Michael Jennings (eds.). The Charitable Impulse: NGOs & Development in East & North-East Africa. Oxford, Bloomfield: James Curry Ltd; Kumarian Press. pp. 94–108. ISBN 9781565491373.
- Martell, Peter (2018). First Raise a Flag. London: Hurst & Company. ISBN 978-1849049597.
- O'Ballance, Edgar (1977). The Secret War in the Sudan: 1955–1972. London: Faber and Faber. ISBN 0-571-10768-0.
- Plaut, Martin (2016). Understanding Eritrea: Inside Africa's Most Repressive State. Oxford: Oxford University Press. ISBN 978-0-19-066959-1.
- Poggo, Scopas (2009). The First Sudanese Civil War Africans, Arabs, And Israelis In The Southern Sudan, 1955-1972. Palgrave Macmillan. ISBN 9780230607965.
- Prunier, Gérard (July 2004). "Rebel Movements and Proxy Warfare: Uganda, Sudan and the Congo (1986-99)". African Affairs. 103 (412): 359–383. doi:10.1093/afraf/adh050. JSTOR 3518562.
- Prunier, Gérard (2009). Africa's World War: Congo, the Rwandan Genocide, and the Making of a Continental Catastrophe. Oxford: Oxford University Press. ISBN 978-0-19-970583-2.
- Reyntjens, Filip (2009). The Great African War: Congo and Regional Geopolitics, 1996-2006. Cambridge University Press. ISBN 978-0-521-11128-7.
- Vuylsteke, Sarah (December 2018). "Identity and Self-determination: The Fertit Opposition in South Sudan" (PDF). HSBA Briefing Paper. Geneva: Small Arms Survey.
