= Sudan Military Railroad =

Railway line in Sudan

The Sudan Military Railway, also known as "Kitchener's Railway", was a military railway constructed from Wadi Halfa to Abu Hamed in 1896 and 1897 by Sirdar Horatio Kitchener in order to supply the Anglo-Egyptian army taking part in the Mahdist War. It was the predecessor line for the present-day Sudan Railway. The construction of the railway would shortern the journey for British forces from northern Egypt to Sudan, from approximately 18 days by canal and river on steamers and with camels, to only 24 hours on the railway if the train steam engines did not fail. This enabled Kitchener to move forces into the heart of the Sudan regardless of season or the height of the Nile and played an important and decisive part in securing Sudan for the British.

== Construction ==
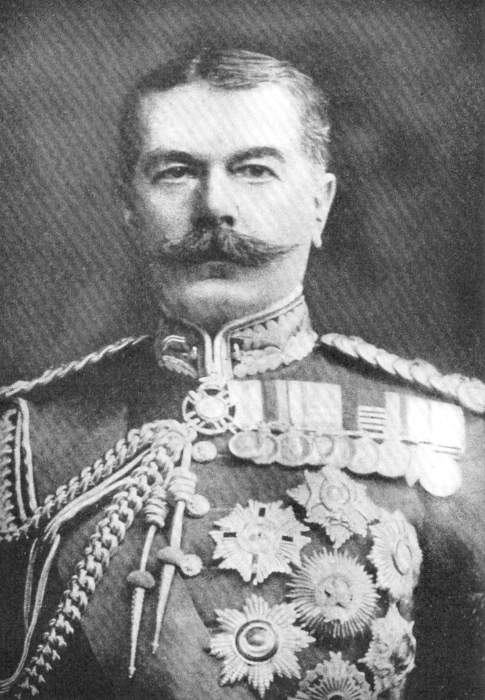
Lord Kitchener, years later

In 1896, Major Horatio Kitchener decided to build the railroad Ismail had planned, but this railroad was not to bring civilization to Sudan or to transport cotton, as Ismail had planned, but to feed and supply the army in Sudan for the Mahdist War. The original plan was to construct the road directly from the former caravan terminus at Korosko, but a shorter route to Wadi Halfa was employed instead, with the link to Egypt provided by steamboat ferry.

=== Gauge ===
The man who approved the expenditure for the railroad, Lord Cromer, assumed that the railroad would be narrow gauge (presumably something like 2' 0" or 2' 6"), to save money. Kitchener, however, insisted on the Cape gauge of 3 feet 6 inches (1,067 mm), the same track width that Cecil Rhodes was then laying between Kimberley and Bulawayo. It turned out that Kitchener had met Rhodes only a few weeks before, when Rhodes stopped in Cairo to obtain some donkeys for use in Rhodesia from Kitchener.

=== Difficulties ===
Even though Rhodes diverted three locomotives to Kitchener that were intended for his own railroad, it did not prevent Kitchener's railroad from becoming an engineering nightmare. There was a "total lack of suitable labor, tools, and materials".

=== Completion ===
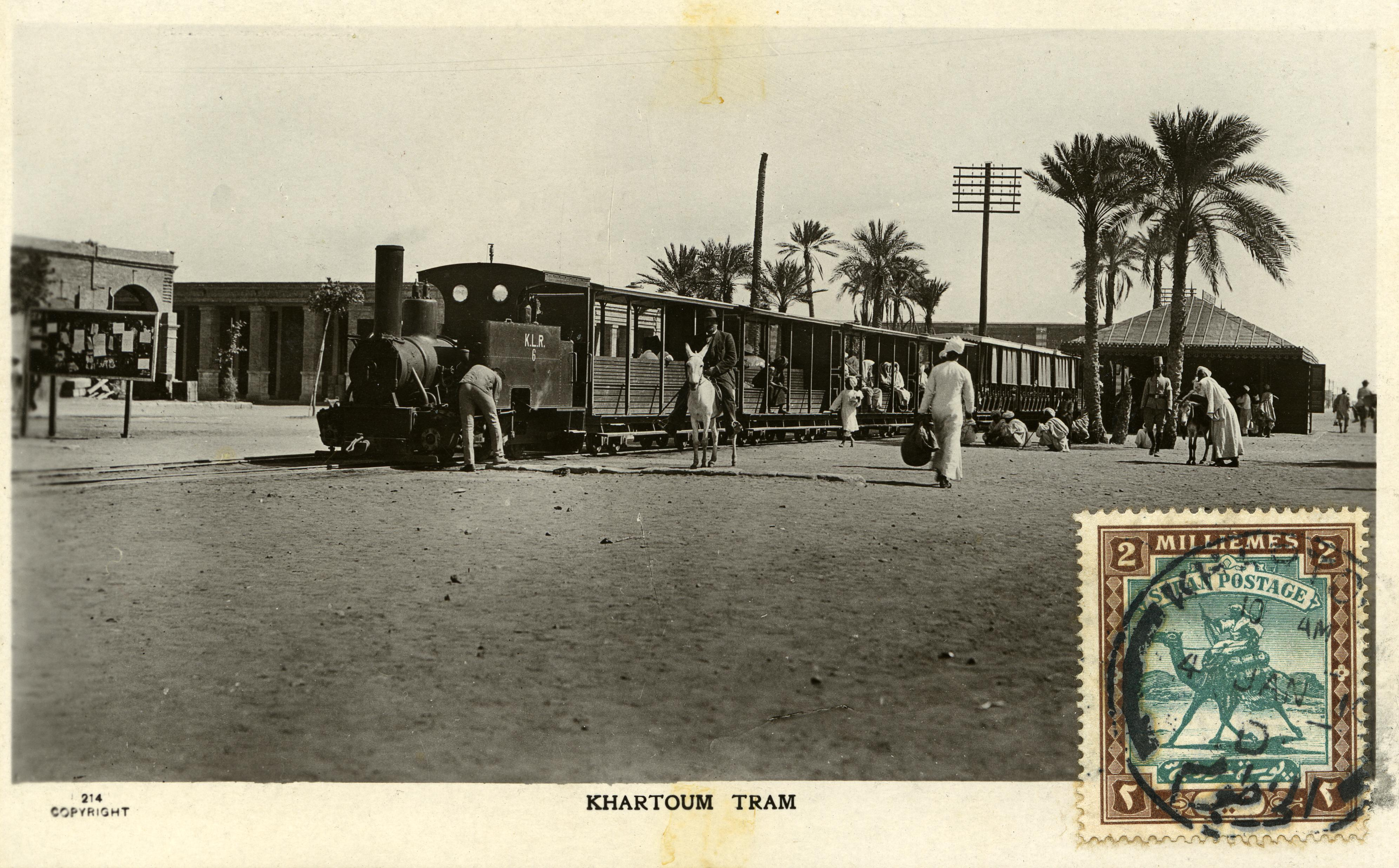
Khartoum Light Railway, c. 1910

In the end, with the help of some "fellahin" (Arabic for farmers) brought from Egypt, and 200 convicts who were paroled for the job, the rail line was completed. There was, however, an unfortunate side effect. The result of the unskilled labor force created "a fairly bumpy ride and frequent accidents — locomotives that flew off tracks and down 15-foot (4.6 m) embankments were hoisted back on the rails and continued along as if nothing had happened."

The railroad helped win the war for the Anglo-Egyptian army against the Mahdist State. The rail line left a gap between Sellal, just south of Aswan, and Wadi Halfa, however, which was covered by a river ferry. Kitchener's line, on a different gauge from the Egyptian line, connected Wadi Halfa with Khartoum North by 1899 and became the main north–south rail connection of the Sudan.

== Legacy ==
In Egypt, a rail line between Alexandria and Cairo had been completed in 1856, three years before work began on the Suez Canal. On May 14, 1858, a rail carriage ferry on this line played a decisive role in Egyptian history. Someone overlooked the normal precaution of securing the wheels of one carriage with chains (only one carriage crossed at a time), and this carriage fell into the Nile, drowning Prince Ahmed, heir apparent to the throne of Egypt. This resulted in Ahmed's brother Ismail being put on the throne.

Ismail saw himself as a builder. He took out huge loans and earned a lot of money from long-staple cotton, the production of which had quintupled, and the price quadrupled due to the American Civil War and its cotton famine. Among Ismail's projects were 910 miles (1,460 km) of new railroads, stretching 231 miles (372 km) southwards from Cairo to Assiut, and including the first line in the Sudan, to Khartoum. Ismail's railroad plans were to wait more than 30 years before they were realized.

== See also ==
- Cape-Cairo Railway
- Transport in Egypt
- Percy Girouard
