= Battle of Abu Hamed =

1897 battle of the Mahdist War

- Part of the Mahdist War
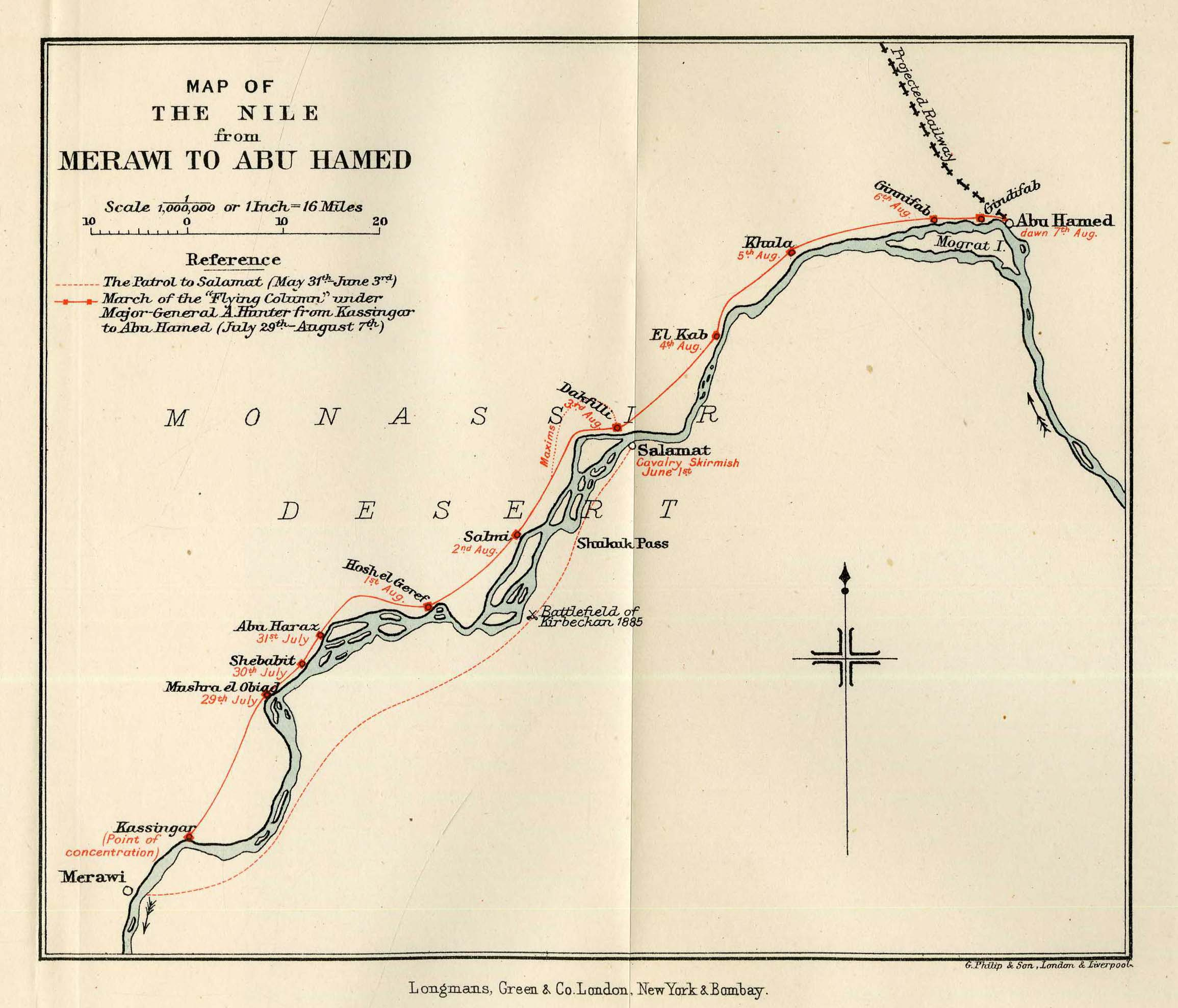
- A map from Winston Churchill's The River War depicting the march of General-Major Hunter's flying column from Merawi to Abu Hamed.
Date	7 August 1897
Location	Abu Hamed, Sudan 19°32′36″N 33°20′16″E
Result	Anglo-Egyptian victory

Belligerents
United Kingdom; Egypt	Mahdist State

Commanders and leaders
Major-General Sir Archibald Hunter	Mohammed Zain (POW)

Strength
3,600 Sudanese and Egyptian soldiers	Between 400 and 1,000 Mahdist riflemen and cavalry

Casualties and losses
23 killed 61 wounded	250–850 killed

The Battle of Abu Hamed occurred on 7 August 1897 between a flying column of Anglo-Egyptian soldiers under Major-General Sir Archibald Hunter and a garrison of Mahdist rebels led by Mohammed Zain. The battle was a victory for the Anglo-Egyptian forces, and secured for the British the strategically vital town of Abu Hamed, which was the terminus for trade and transportation across the Nubian Desert.

Abu Hamed was of critical importance to Lord Herbert Horatio Kitchener, leader of the Anglo-Egyptian campaign that commenced in March 1896 with the objective of destroying the Mahdist state that had occupied much of Sudan since the initial Mahdist rebellion broke out in 1881. The town was to be the railhead for Lord Kitchener's supply railway through the vast and inhospitable Nubian Desert, allowing expeditionary forces to bypass a great stretch of the Nile on their way to Omdurman, the capital of Mahdist Sudan. However, the town was occupied by Mahdist forces, and construction of the desert railway could not safely proceed without their removal.

Accordingly, Kitchener ordered a flying column, led by Major-General Sir Archibald Hunter and composed of around three-thousand Egyptian soldiers, to march from Merowe to Abu Hamed with all possible speed. The flying column departed Merawi on 29 July 1897, and, marching north-east along the Nile for eight days, arrived at the town as dawn broke on August 7. Forming his battalions in a broad semi-circle that pitted Abu Hamed's defenders against the river, Major-General Hunter ordered his troops to advance at approximately six-thirty that morning. In the action that followed, the outnumbered Mahdist riflemen were driven from their defensive positions through the town, while a small contingent of Mahdist cavalry fled south without engaging to report the loss. By seven-thirty, the battle was over, and Major-General Hunter ordered the news be delivered to Lord Kitchener.

Major-General Hunter's column lost eighty killed and wounded, while the quantity of Mahdist casualties is estimated to be between 250 and 850. The Mahdist commander, Mohammed Zain, was captured in the fighting. Soon after news of the victory spread, work on the desert railway was resumed and Abu Hamed reached on October 31, where Major-General Hunter and his column had remained. With the completion of the railway across the Nubian Desert, Kitchener's general advance into the heartland of Mahdist Sudan was guaranteed, and the greatest issue of Kitchener's campaign, supply, resolved.

== Origins ==
=== Background ===
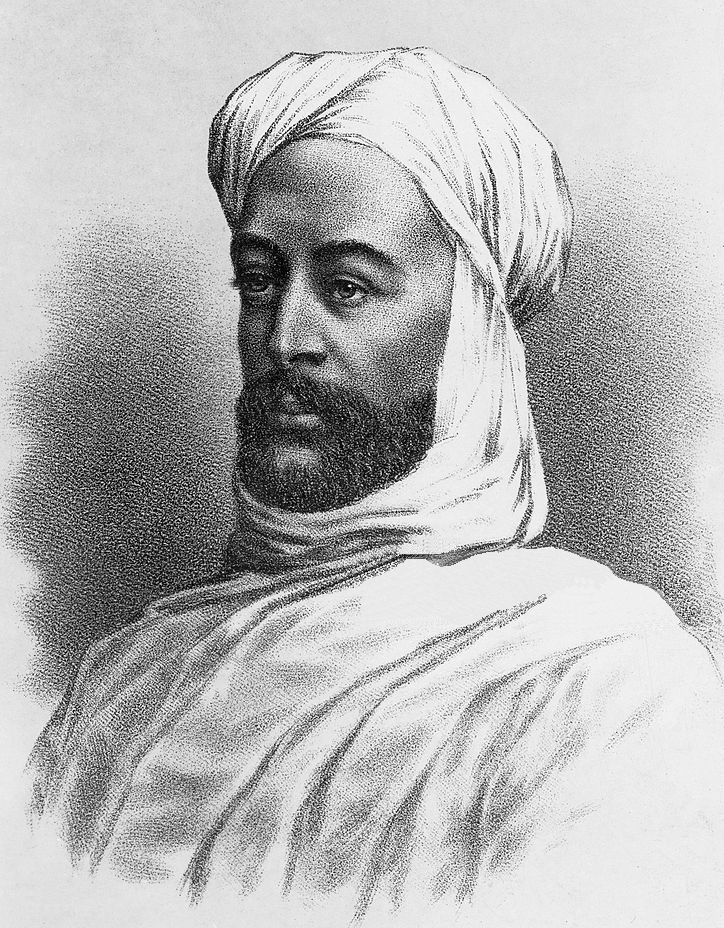
Muhammad Ahmad al-Mahdi

The Mahdist Rebellion broke out in 1881 when a religious leader, the self-proclaimed Mahdi, declared a jihad against the Egyptian government, which had been subject to increasing British control since the construction of the Suez Canal around a decade earlier. Leveraging widespread resentment towards European influence in Egypt and preaching renewal of the Islamic faith, the Mahdi began to accumulate followers and soon presented a serious threat to the government. Early Egyptian-led efforts to suppress the movement failed spectacularly, and their humiliating defeat at the hands of the outnumbered, outgunned, and undersupplied Mahdist force only increased their leader's fame and reputation.

By the time the British intervened directly in 1883, the Mahdi had set about conquering much of Sudan, at the time controlled by Egypt, and had won several critical victories that provided him great wealth and modern weaponry. Colonel William Hicks, a British officer, was appointed commander of eight thousand Egyptian soldiers and an extensive supply train, and was given the simple objective of crushing the insurrection. Colonel Hicks and nearly every man in his army was killed by an overwhelming Mahdist force at the Battle of El Obeid. After this defeat, and facing immense financial difficulties in Egypt, the British government decided not to pursue further offensive action and instead selected General Charles George Gordon to lead the evacuation effort, as thousands of civilians and pounds of equipment were to be withdrawn from outposts throughout Sudan.

Gordon, operating out of Khartoum, helped extricate many loyal civilians who remained in Sudan, but ultimately refused to abandon the city. Contrary to his orders, he retained a small force in Khartoum and determined to give battle with the Mahdi before relinquishing control. Accordingly, Mahdist forces besieged Khartoum in March 1884, isolating the city from the outside world and placing a dire timer upon Gordon to surrender. After much delay, the British government reluctantly dispatched a relief expedition under Sir Garnet Wolseley that would rapidly follow the Nile to Khartoum. Wolseley's column arrived on 28 January 1885, two days after Khartoum had fallen and General Charles Gordon's head was delivered to the Mahdi.

The Mahdi died less than six months later, but not before establishing his Islamic state in Sudan and relocating its capital to Omdurman. A subordinate known as the Khalifa succeeded him after a violent power struggle, and prevented the collapse of the state following the Mahdi's death through ruthless and effective administration.

=== Kitchener's Expedition ===
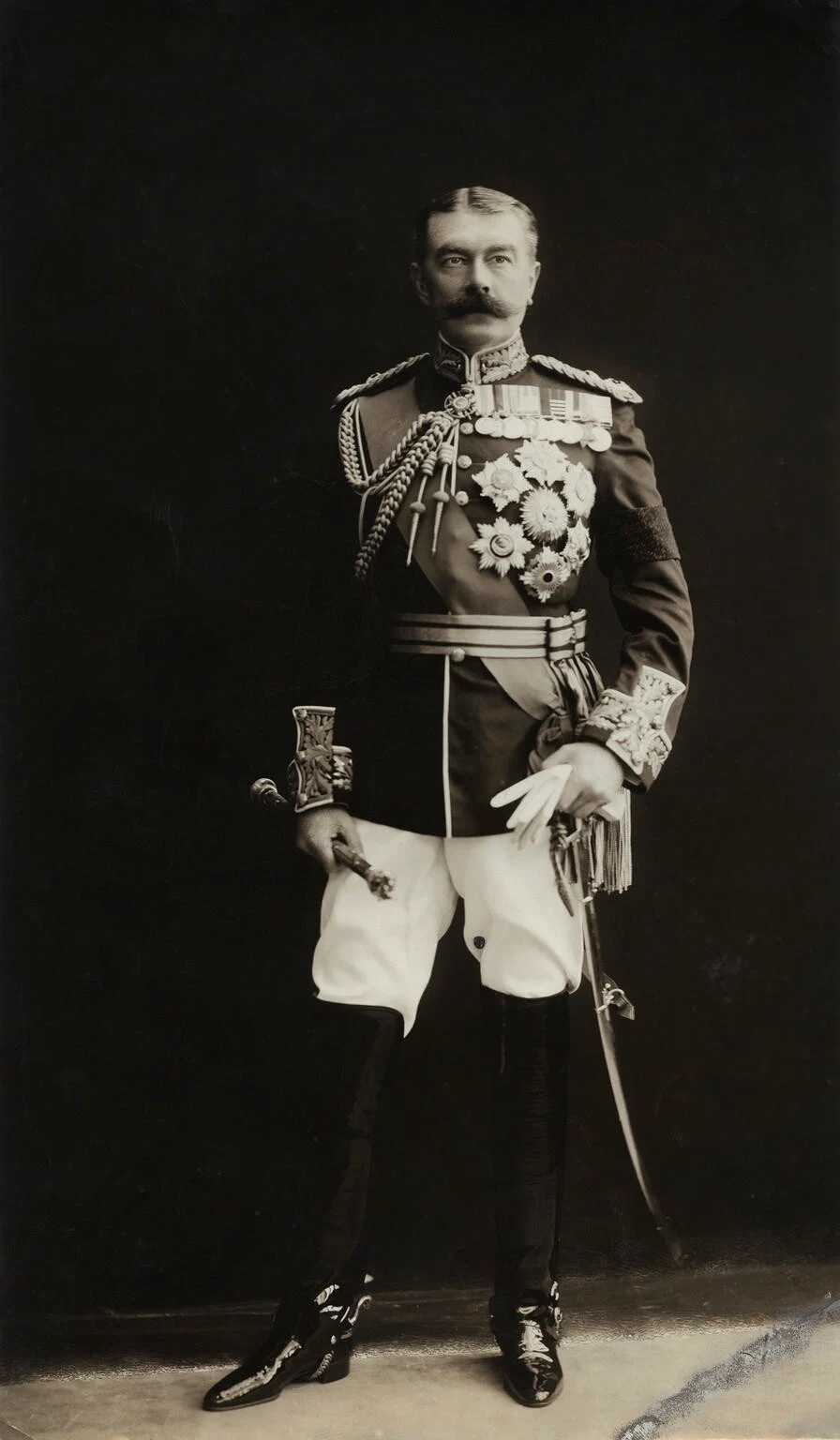
Field-Marshal Horatio Herbert Kitchener

The British and Egyptian governments would not again attempt major intervention until 1896, whereupon the government in Britain was impelled to act by several factors. The Egyptian economy had improved since British administrators commandeered the country's finances. Public sentiment towards Mahdist Sudan had been stoked by several embellished accounts of the Mahdists' savagery and the desire to avenge General Charles Gordon. France, Britain's longtime competitor in the Scramble for Africa, was beginning to encroach upon the Nile river valley, alongside the Belgians. Finally, it was politically advantageous in Europe for Britain to distract the Khalifa from the Italians in Eritrea, who had been made vulnerable by a recent defeat at the hands of Menelik II, Emperor of Ethiopia. The government chose Herbert Horatio Kitchener to lead the new expedition, outfitting him with around ten-thousand soldiers and Britain's latest technology: Maxim guns, heavy artillery, and a small fleet of gunboats.

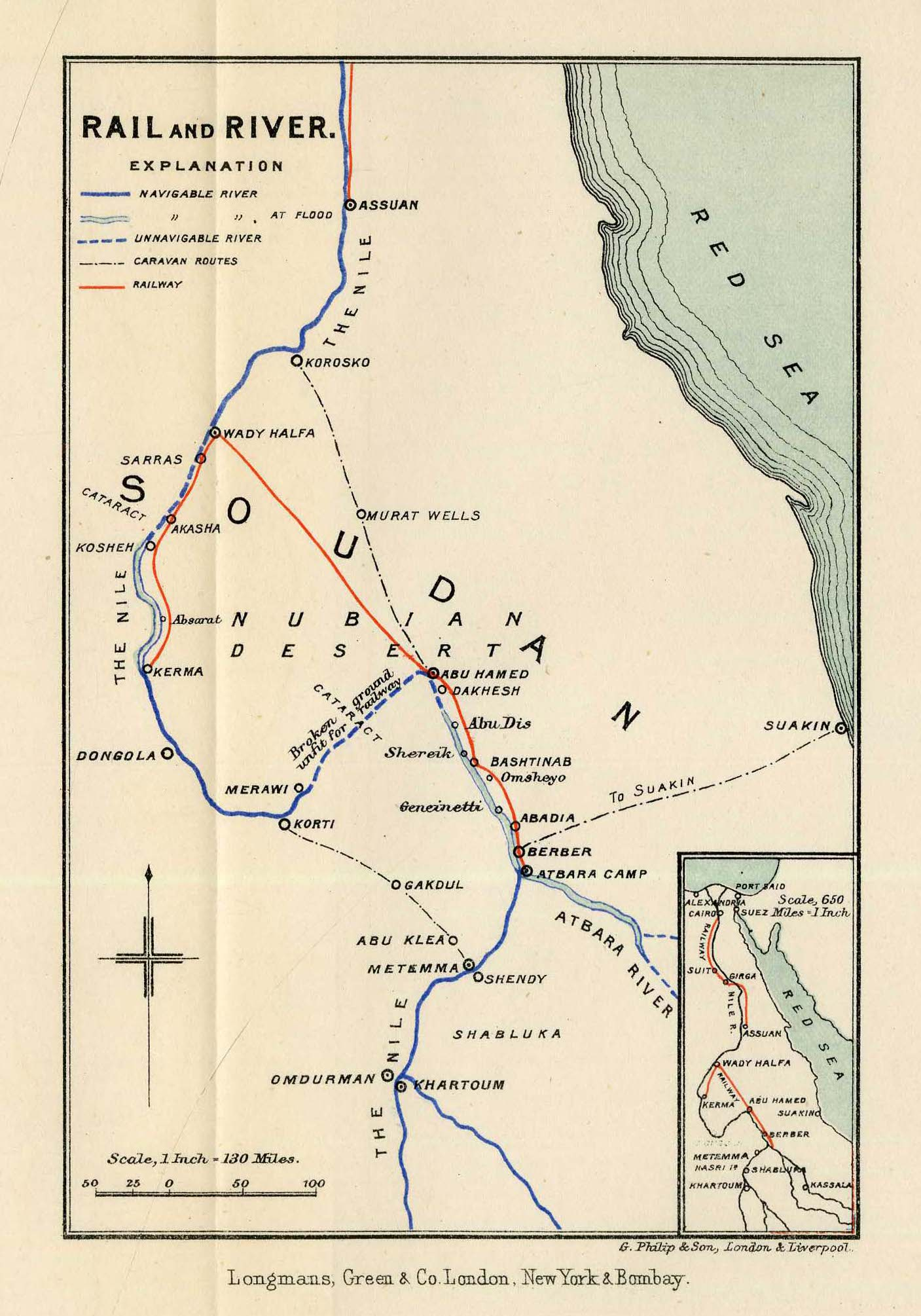
Map of Kitchener's supply and communication lines in Sudan

Kitchener's expedition embarked in March 1896, leaving Egypt behind and entering Mahdist Sudan later that month. His column advanced along the Nile, using the river for resupply and communication, while laying track around the unnavigable sections. However, the expedition could not proceed in this fashion all the way to Omdurman. The river travels far south to Ed Debba before bending steeply to the north-east up to Abu Hamed, where it pivots once more to the south and winds on past Khartoum. The section of the river from Merowe to Abu Hamed is made unnavigable by continuous cataracts, and the ground along its banks is unsuitable for railroads. These conditions did not render the approach impossible, only difficult, dangerous, and slow. Kitchener sought an alternative route, and settled on one widely thought to be infeasible: he determined to build a railway across the vast, dry, and scorching Nubian Desert that would connect Wadi Halfa to Abu Hamed, a small town then under Mahdist control. Premier engineers in Britain deemed the railroad an impossibility for several reasons, foremost of which being the speculated lack of available water sources along 120 miles of the proposed 230 mile line. Kitchener disregarded this impediment and all others, ordering the well-known Lieutenant Percy Girouard to make preparations to begin construction. The capable engineer conducted extensive surveys of the proposed line, and found that, although the terrain was certainly difficult, and water fearfully sparse, the line was possible. The decision was made in December 1896, and work on the railway officially begun 1 January 1897.

Despite the immense difficulties involved in the development of such a railway, steady progress was made, and by 23 July 1897 the track stretched 103 miles into the desert. Here, however, progress was halted, for fear of coming within range of Mahdist raids from Abu Hamed. Work on the railway could not resume until the town had been taken; the entire campaign was stalled, awaiting the completion of the line to begin the general advance. As well, every delay offered greater chances for disaster; if the Mahdists were alerted to Kitchener's plans, the whole operation would be jeopardized and the catastrophic fate of General Gordon's expedition potentially repeated. In May a scouting mission under Captain Le Gallais had reconnoitered the area surrounding Abu Hamed, reporting that the town was weakly defended and the Mahdist presence throughout the area fairly slim, though the Khalifa's forces had been moving recently and no one could be sure reinforcements were not on the way. Kitchener had to act fast; in late July he informed the respected and accomplished Major-General Sir Archibald Hunter that he had been selected to lead the assault.

=== Major-General Hunter's Flying Column ===
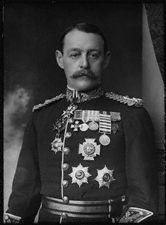
Major-General Sir Archibald Hunter

The plan was for Major-General Hunter and a flying column of crack troops to race with all possible speed from Merowe north-east to Abu Hamed, where they would surprise the numerically inferior Mahdist garrison and win control of the town. Speed was essential, for it was certain Hunter's column would be spotted by Mahdist scouts during the journey. If these scouts managed to send word and reinforce the town prior to Hunter's arrival, his column might find itself outmatched and forced to retreat.

The troops selected for the operation were among the best soldiers in Kitchener's army: the 3rd Egyptian, 9th Sudanese, 10th Sudanese, and 11th Sudanese Battalions, composing Lieutenant Hector Archibald MacDonald's brigade. Additionally, Hunter's column included an artillery battery, containing six Krupp twelve-pounders, two Maxim guns, and a pair of older British machine guns, a Gardner and a Nordenfelt. Finally, a single troop of cavalry was attached to the column along with a substantial supply of camels for transport and supply. The column had rations for eighteen days, and telegraph cable was supplied in the hope that constant communication could be ensured as the column made the 146 mile journey through the desert. Overall, the force numbered around 3,600 soldiers.

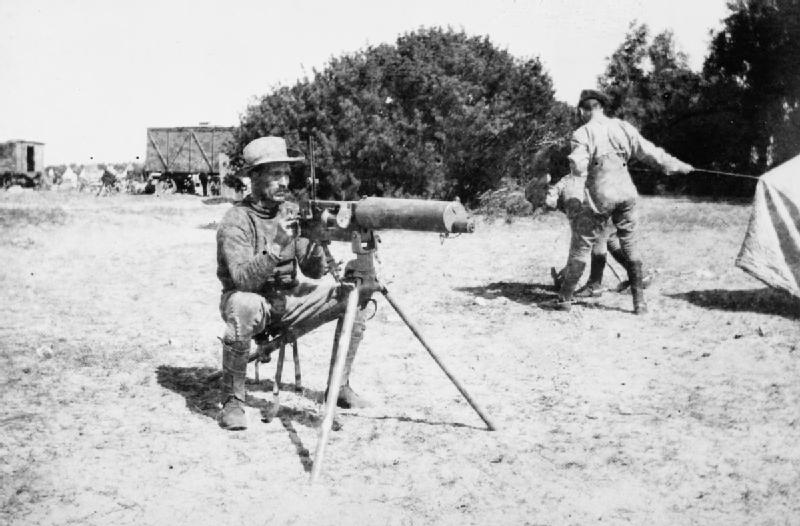
Boer War-era Maxim gun

Major-General Hunter's flying column set out from Kassinger, a small town a few miles north of Merowe, at 5:30 the evening of July 29, marching only at night so as to avoid both the heat of the sun and the eyes of any Mahdist lookouts. There was no road or path to follow, and the terrain upon which Hunter's flying column marched was nearly nontraversable; the route alternated between broken, rocky ground and ankle-high sand, ultimately proving extremely difficult to navigate in the dark of night. Added to these difficulties was the measure of speed imposed upon the column, as the mounted Major-General Hunter and Lieutenant MacDonald drove their units to their breaking points in order to preempt Mahdist reinforcements. The column advanced until midnight, completing a march of over sixteen miles. Sleeping during the day was made impossible by the sweltering heat; only when adequate shade was found in the barren desert could the exhausted men of Hunter's flying column rest.

The advance continued in this fashion until the village of El Kab was reached on August 4, where a shot fired at the column alerted Major-General Hunter that his presence was known to the Mahdists. Fully aware that reinforcements would be on their way to Abu Hamed, Major-General Hunter further increased his column's pace, despite the deaths of three soldiers of the 3rd Egyptian Battalion and the loss of fifty-eight stragglers at various points along the route. Hunter's forces were supplemented at Kuli by 150 Ababdeh friendlies on August 5. The night of August 6, the column marched another sixteen miles over exceptionally arduous terrain to Ginnifab, only two miles from Abu Hamed. Here half the 3rd Egyptian Battalion detached from the column to escort the supply train as it arrived and guard the reserve ammunition. After a two-hour rest from 3:20 to 5:30, Major-General Hunter ordered his men to attention and began the final assault.

== Battle ==
The town of Abu Hamed was a small, inscrutable network of houses and alleyways on the bank of the Nile river, surrounded on three sides by a slightly elevated plateau. Three stone watchtowers stood nearby, from which Mahdist lookouts spotted Major-General Hunter's force advancing from the north. The reinforcements from Berber had not arrived in time, but the town's commander, Mohammed Zain, refused to flee. The garrison rushed to occupy the town's defenses; Mahdist riflemen took positions in the trenches in front of the town, melee infantry stationed themselves inside houses and throughout the streets, and a small band of cavalry stood by, ready to act. All told, the defense numbered between four hundred and one thousand soldiers.

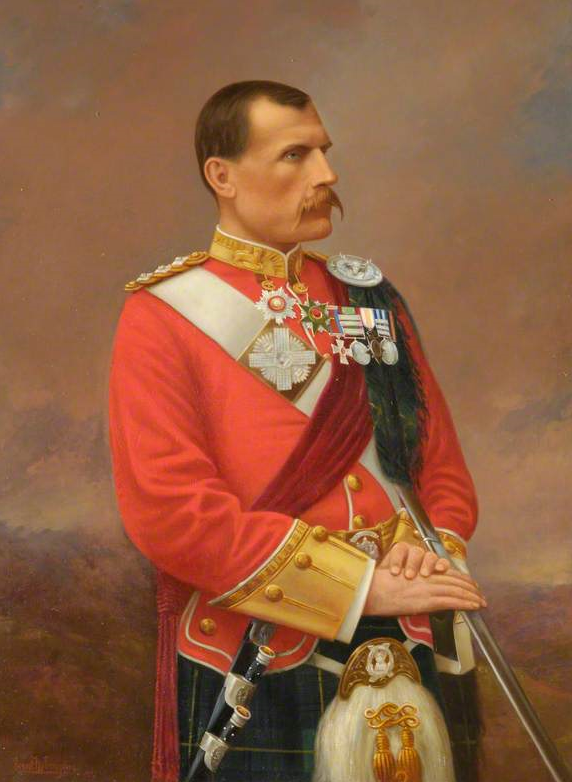
Lieutenant Hector Archibald MacDonald

Hunter's force advanced towards the town in a semi-circle formation, composed by the four battalions arranged from left to right in the following order: the 10th Sudanese, 9th Sudanese, the reduced 3rd Egyptian, and the 11th Sudanese. The artillery battery was with the 3rd Egyptian. The force reached the ridge of the plateau overlooking the town, about three hundred yards away, at a quarter past six. Major-General Hunter, finding the Mahdist garrison prepared for the assault and entrenched in their defenses, ordered the artillery to bombard their positions, which commenced at 6:30. However, the artillery proved ineffective, as the guns were unable to strike within the narrow trenches or blast aside the cover behind which the Mahdist infantry waited. Hunter ceased the barrage, and ordered Lieutenant MacDonald to lead his brigade in a general advance. The command to fix bayonets was given, and the troops began an orderly advance across the three hundred yards that separated them from their objective. However, facing a line of Mahdist riflemen well-protected in their trenches, the soldiers of each advancing battalion were compelled to open fire without direct orders. The uncoordinated volleys of the advancing brigade were moderately effective against the Mahdist riflemen, who had not yet returned fire. When the battalions were about halfway across the three hundred yard stretch, their lines of fire began to converge due to their semi-circle formation, and the 10th Sudanese, on the left, was forced to halt to avoid coming under the fire of the rightmost 11th Sudanese.

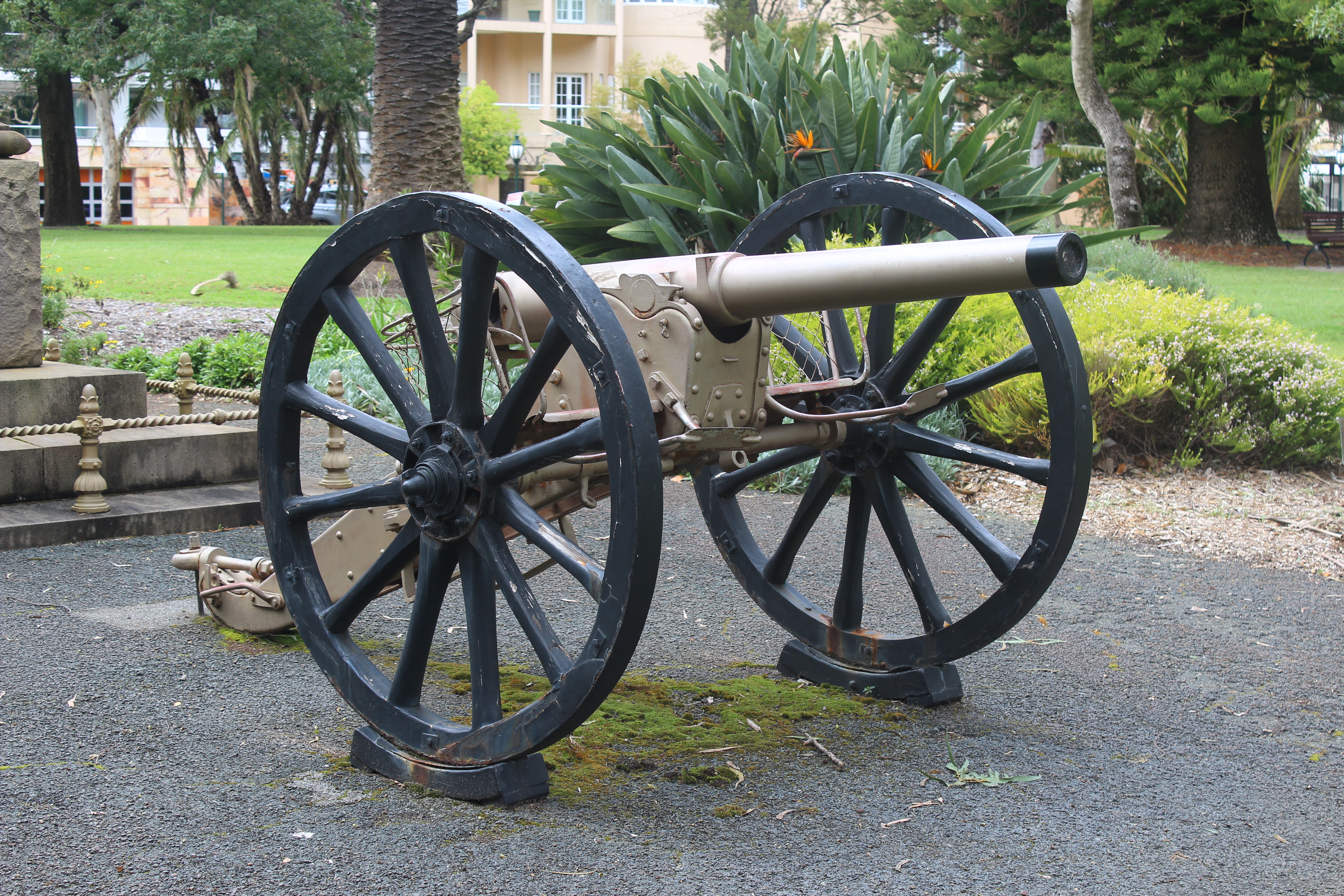
Krupp 75 mm field gun similar to those used in Major-General Archibald Hunter's artillery battery

The Mahdists in the trenches, equipped with outdated rifles and makeshift ammunition, designed to wait until Hunter's forces were well within range to open fire. The entrenched Mahdists weathered the continual barrage of the advancing forces until the distance shrunk to one hundred yards. Together, the Mahdist line erupted in rifle fire, hammering the advancing battalions and, in particular, the stationary 10th Sudanese. Two British officers, Brevet-Major Henry Sidney and Lieutenant Edward Fitzclarence, three Egyptian officers, and a dozen regular soldiers were killed in the volleys. Over fifty were wounded across the brigade. Following this exchange, the battalions abandoned their orderly approach and charged the trenches with their bayonets. A furious melee ensued, wherein soldiers of MacDonald's brigade poured into the trenches and through the town, engaging in vicious hand-to-hand combat with Mahdists wherever they were to be found in the winding alleyways and narrow houses of Abu Hamed. In several places artillery was used to dislodge particularly stalwart defenders, while the Mahdist cavalry, looking on as Hunter's battalions swept through the town, turned to flee south towards Berber.

By 7:30, the town was firmly in the hands of Major-General Hunter's force. Almost the entirety of the Mahdist garrison, excepting the cavalry, had been slain in desperate combat throughout the settlement. However, a few isolated pockets of Mahdist resistance remained in fortified houses, violently refusing to give up the fight. Six men sent to capture a Mahdist sniper's position in a small house near the river were each killed, forcing Hunter to invoke his artillery. The building was shelled to ruins, but the sniper survived, evidenced by the shooting of another soldier sent to locate his body. Finally, a second barrage of artillery blasted what remained of the structure and the rubble fell silent, though the sniper's body was never found. The local inhabitants had armed themselves with clubs and spears to defend themselves during the battle, but played little role in its outcome.

== Aftermath ==
Sources differ on the number of Mahdists killed in the battle, ranging between 250 and 850. On the Anglo-Egyptian side, twenty-three men were killed and sixty-one wounded. The 10th Sudanese Battalion alone accounted for sixteen of the twenty-three killed and thirty-four of the sixty-one wounded. The Mahdist commander, Mohammed Zain, was captured in battle and held prisoner. Major-General Hunter captured a substantial supply of weapons, camels, horses, and property from the town. After the battle, the soldiers of MacDonald's brigade were berated by their commander for opening fire during their advance across the three hundred yard gradient between the ridge of the plateau and the town's defenses. Lieutenant MacDonald had not ordered them to do so, and considered it flagrant insubordination that botched his plan for a 150 yard bayonet charge. Brevet-Major Henry Sidney and Lieutenant Edward Fitzclarence, great-grandson of King William IV, were the only two British officers killed in action throughout the entire campaign. The dead of Major-General Hunter's column were buried near the town, the British officers in decorated tombs and the rest in unmarked graves. There is a legend which holds that the tomb of Lieutenant Sidney, one of the two British officers killed during the battle, is vigilantly guarded every night by the ghosts of those killed in his battalion.

The news of Major-General Hunter's victory was delivered by riders and telegrams to the officials of Kitchener's army, though several sources report that Kitchener himself learned of the victory when the corpses of several Mahdist rebels floated by Merowe on the Nile, downstream from Abu Hamed. As soon as the news reached him, work on the desert railway was resumed, and the construction effort progressed rapidly, reaching Abu Hamed by 31 October 1897. The success of the desert railway was of unparalleled importance to Kitchener's campaign; his army's advance towards the Mahdist seat of power and the necessary maintenance of that army wholly relied upon the trains bearing water, supplies, and reinforcements that arrived on a daily basis. The capture of Abu Hamed allowed for the completion of this railway across the forbidding Nubian Desert and made Kitchener's approach possible.

When Major-General Hunter won Abu Hamed from its defenders, the Mahdist reinforcements he knew had been racing towards the town since his force was spotted on August 4 were less than twenty miles away. Running low on supplies and recognizing the severe exhaustion of his men, Hunter doubted his ability to hold the town in the likely event of a counter-attack from these approaching forces. However, the small troop of Mahdist cavalry that had fled the battle met the incoming detachment and informed them of the events, whereupon they immediately changed course due southwards in the opposite direction of Abu Hamed. The commanding Mahdist officer at Berber heard of the battle on August 9, and, facing incoming Anglo-Egyptian forces as well as violent internal division, decided to evacuate the city in late August. Major-General Hunter then left Abu Hamed, where he and his column had remained since the battle, and moved south to occupy the city and further advance the campaign.

== Sources ==
- Churchill, Winston (1902). The River War: An Historical Account of the Reconquest of the Sudan. The Floating Press. ISBN 978-1-77653-061-8.
- Alford, Henry Stamford Lewis (1898). The Egyptian Soudan: Its Loss and Its Recovery, Volume 1. Egypt: Macmillan and Company, Ltd. ISBN 978-1-286-58063-9.
- Asher, Michael (2006). Khartoum: The Ultimate Imperial Adventure. Penguin UK. ISBN 978-0-14-191010-9.
- Warner, Philip (2010). Dervish: The Rise and Fall of an African Empire. Pen and Sword. ISBN 978-1-4738-1351-9.
- Arthur, Sir George (1920). Life of Lord Kitchener, Volume 1. Cosimo, Inc. ISBN 978-1-60206-363-1.
- Budge, Sir Ernest Alfred Wallis (1901). Egyptian Magic. Egypt: Kegan Paul, Trench, Trubner and Company, Inc. ISBN 978-0-486-22681-1.
- Keown-Boyd, Henry (1986). A Good Dusting: The Sudan Campaigns 1883 - 1899. Pen and Sword. ISBN 978-0-436-23288-6.
- Sanderson, Edgar (1907). Great Britain in Modern Africa. Steeley and Company, Ltd. ISBN 978-0-8371-2860-3.
- Lamothe, Ronald M. (2011). Slaves of Fortune: Sudanese Soldiers and the River War, 1896-1898. Boydell and Brewer, Ltd. ISBN 978-1-84701-042-1.
- Pakenham, Thomas (1991). The Scramble For Africa: The White Man's Conquest of the Dark Continent from 1876 to 1912. New York: Random House, Inc. ISBN 0-394-51576-5.
- Perry, James (2005). Arrogant Armies: Great Military Disasters and the Generals Behind Them. Castle Books. ISBN 978-0-7858-2023-9.
- Kochanski, Halik (1999). Sir Garnet Wolseley: Victorian Hero. A&C Black. ISBN 978-1-85285-188-0.
- Fadlalla, Mohamed Hassan (2004). Short History of Sudan. iUniverse. ISBN 978-0-595-31425-6.
- Green, Dominic (2007). Three Empires on the Nile: The Victorian Jihad, 1869-1899. Simon and Schuster. ISBN 978-0-7432-9895-7.
- Holt, P. M. (2011). The History of Sudan: From the Coming of Islam to the Present Day. Routledge. ISBN 978-1-4058-7445-8.
- Simner, Mark (2017). The Sirdar and the Khalifa: Kitchener's Re-conquest of the Sudan 1896-98. Fonthill Media. ISBN 978-1-78155-588-0.
- Daly, M. W. (1997). The Sirdar: Sir Reginald Wingate and the British Empire in the Middle East, Volume 22. American Philosophical Society. ISBN 978-0-87169-222-1.
- Gleichen, Lord Edward (1905). The Anglo-Egyptian Sudan: A Compendium Prepared by Officers of the Sudan Government, Volume 1. H. M. Stationery Office. ISBN 978-1-177-77514-4.
- Wright, William (2011). Battle Story: Omdurman 1898. The History Press. ISBN 978-0-7524-7887-6.
- Raugh Jr., Harold E. (2008). British Military Operations in Egypt and the Sudan: A Selected Bibliography. Scarecrow Press. ISBN 978-1-4616-5700-2.
- Crabitès, Pierre (1934). The Winning of the Sudan. Routledge. ISBN 978-1-315-44414-7.
- Farwell, Byron (2001). The Encyclopedia of Nineteenth-century Land Warfare: An Illustrated World View. W. W. Norton & Company. ISBN 978-0-393-04770-7.
- Lewis, David Levering (2001). Race to Fashoda. Macmillan. ISBN 978-0-8050-7119-1.
- Spiers, Edward M. (1998). Sudan: The Reconquest Reappraised. Psychology Press. ISBN 978-0-7146-4749-4.
