= Mograt Island =

River island in Sudan

- Interactive map of Mograt Island

Geography
- Coordinates: 19°30′0″N 33°15′0″E

Administration
- Sudan
- State: River Nile State
- District: Abu Hamad District

Mograt Island is a river island in Sudan, south of the town of Abu Hamad, where the Nile River bends west. It is the largest island on the Nile and the largest island of Sudan. Mograt is located on the northeastern part of the country, between the fourth and fifth cataracts. The island is situated 400 km north of Khartoum, the country's capital.

The majority of people living on the island are Rubatab.

The Mograt Island Archaeological Mission (MIAMi) began working on the island in 2013. Archaeologists have uncovered evidence from the Stone Age, Bronze Age, and medieval periods, including cemeteries, fortresses, and settlements.
