= Anfila =

Coordinates: 14°47′00″N 40°50′00″E

Anfila (Arabic: أنفيلا) was a settlement and historic district on the Red Sea coast, which was claimed by Ethiopia in the 19th and 20th centuries. It has a large plain, and is 10 miles or 18.5 km southeast of Ras Madir and Ras Anfila, and an equal distance from small hills.

In the 1880s, the bay was the scene of Italian maneuvering in the African War of the 1880s. claimed Eritrea as their colony, including the Bay of Anfila, and sent scientists to survey the plant life. The Italian military subsequently took over the area around the bay of Anfila, as part of the colony of Eritrea, including specifically the villages of Ras Anfila and Ras Madir.

As of 1922, there were three small villages on its shore: Arassan, Madir, and Anfila.

It is in present-day Eritrea, along with the nearby Bay of Zula.

Once used as a port for caravans, the Bay of Anfila is uninhabited.

== See also ==
This is a chronological list of wars in the area:

- Italian Eritrea
- Mahdist War
- Italo-Ethiopian War of 1887–1889
- First Italo-Ethiopian War
- Second Italo-Ethiopian War
- Mediterranean and Middle East theatre of World War II
- East African campaign (World War II)
- Eritrean War of Independence
