= Abu Amama =

Proposed new seaport in Sudan

Abu Amama was a proposed new seaport located 200 km to the north of Port Sudan on the Red Sea. It had an attached enterprise zone. A 450 km road from Abu Hamad, an economic zone, an airport and an agricultural zone of 400,000 feddans (415,000 acres) was included in the project.

AD Ports Group of Abu Dhabi and Invictus Investment of Dubai have signed a preliminary agreement in 2022 with Sudan to build and operate the port and an economic zone in the Red Sea with a US$6 billion investment. Sudan was entitled to 35% of the profit of the investment.

On 3 November 2024, the Sudanese government cancelled the agreement, accusing Abu Dhabi's of support for the Rapid Support Forces in the Sudanese civil war (2023–present).
