= Mahdist War =

1881–1899 Sudanese revolt against Anglo-Egyptian rule

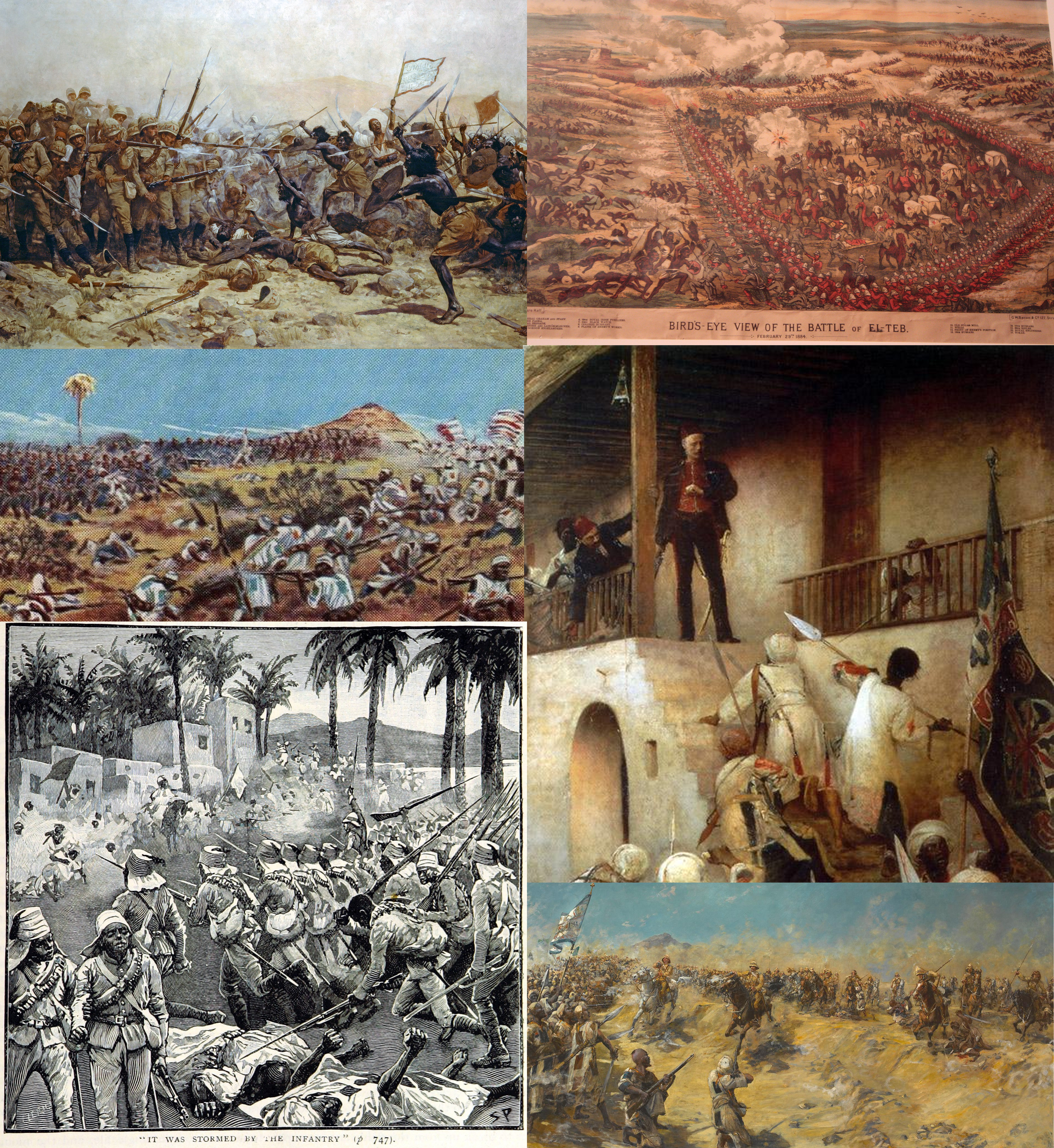
- Major events of the Mahdist War. From clockwise left: the Battle of Abu Klea, the Battle of El Teb, Death of Charles Gordon at Khartoum, Charge of the 21st Lancers at Omdurman, the Battle of Ferkeh, and the Battle of Rejaf
| Date | 12 August, 1881 – 25 November, 1899 (18 years, 3 months, 1 week, and 6 days) |
| Location | Sudan, South Sudan, Egypt, Eritrea, Ethiopia, Uganda |
| Result | Allied victory; Sudanese invasions of neighbours repelled |
| Territorial changes | Establishment of Anglo-Egyptian Sudan, a polity jointly ruled by Britain and Egypt; Kassala temporarily occupied by Italy; Congo secures the Lado Enclave until 1910 |

Belligerents
| Britain • Egypt • India • Canada • New South Wales; Italy • (Kingdom of Italy) Eritrea; Ethiopia; Congo Free State | Mahdist State |

Commanders and leaders
| (United Kingdom of Great Britain and Ireland) Charles Gordon † (United Kingdom of Great Britain and Ireland) Frederick Burnaby † (United Kingdom of Great Britain and Ireland) William Hicks † (United Kingdom of Great Britain and Ireland) Garnet Wolseley (United Kingdom of Great Britain and Ireland) John Stewart † (United Kingdom of Great Britain and Ireland) William Earle † (United Kingdom of Great Britain and Ireland) Herbert Kitchener (United Kingdom of Great Britain and Ireland) Reginald Wingate (United Kingdom of Great Britain and Ireland) Francis Grenfell (United Kingdom of Great Britain and Ireland) Hector MacDonald (United Kingdom of Great Britain and Ireland) Leslie Rundle (United Kingdom of Great Britain and Ireland) Charles Parsons (United Kingdom of Great Britain and Ireland) Archibald Hunter (United Kingdom of Great Britain and Ireland) Herbert Stewart † (United Kingdom of Great Britain and Ireland) Charles Wilson (United Kingdom of Great Britain and Ireland) Valentine Baker (United Kingdom of Great Britain and Ireland) John McNeill (United Kingdom of Great Britain and Ireland) Gerald Graham (United Kingdom of Great Britain and Ireland) Stanley Colville (United Kingdom of Great Britain and Ireland) Colin Keppel (United Kingdom of Great Britain and Ireland) David Beatty (Khedivate of Egypt) Muhammad Pasha # (Khedivate of Egypt) Hassan Pasha (Austrian Empire) Rudolf Slatin (Ethiopian Empire) Yohannes IV † (Ethiopian Empire) Alula Engida (WIA) (Ethiopian Empire) Tekle Haimanot (Ethiopian Empire) Ras Mengesha Yohannes (Ethiopian Empire) Mikael of Wollo (Ethiopian Empire) Gobana Dacche (Kingdom of Italy) Oreste Baratieri (Kingdom of Italy) Giuseppe Arimondi (Congo Free State) Louis-Napoléon Chaltin | (Mahdist State) Muhammad Ahmad # (Mahdist State) Abdallahi ibn Muhammad † (Mahdist State) Othman Digna (WIA) (Mahdist State) Ali Wad Hilu † (Mahdist State) Muhammad Sharif (POW) (Mahdist State) Sanin Husain |

Casualties and losses
- According to Sir Reginald Wingate, Sudan's population was reduced by more than half during the period of Mahdist rule with estimates varying between 4 and 6 million. These numbers are considered exaggerated by some contemporary academics. (Note: Sudan's population was between 7 and 8.5 million before the revolt began in 1881 and it declined to between 2 and 3.5 million in 1899 at the time of the fall of Mahdist state.)

The Mahdist War (Note: The British participation in the war is called the Sudan campaign. Other names for this war include the Mahdist Revolt, the Anglo–Sudan War and the Sudanese Mahdist Revolt.) (Arabic: الثورة المهدية, romanized: ath-Thawra al-Mahdiyya; 1881–1899) was fought between the Mahdist Sudanese, led by Muhammad Ahmad bin Abdullah, who had proclaimed himself the "Mahdi" of Islam (the "Guided One"), and the forces of the Khedivate of Egypt, initially, and later the forces of Britain. After four years, the Mahdist rebels overthrew the Ottoman-Egyptian administration with the fall of Khartoum and gained control over Sudan. The Mahdist State launched several unsuccessful invasions of their neighbours, expanding the scale of the conflict to also include the Italian Empire, the Congo Free State and the Ethiopian Empire. They also faced significant internal rebellion, and a major famine.

Anglo-Egyptian forces reconquered Sudan in 1898 and the Mahdist state collapsed following defeat at the battle of Omdurman. The last organised resistance from the Mahdists ended the next year, leading to the creation of Anglo-Egyptian Sudan (1899–1956), a de jure condominium of the British Empire and the Kingdom of Egypt, in which Britain had de facto control over Sudan.

== Background ==
Following Muhammad Ali's invasion in 1820–1821, Sudan was incorporated into the Ottoman–Egyptian state and governed as part of the Turco-Egyptian administration, Turco-Egyptian Sudan, known locally as 'the Turkiyah'.

Throughout the period of Turco-Egyptian rule, large sections of the Sudanese population suffered severe economic hardship as a result of heavy taxation, forced labor, and administrative coercion imposed by the central government. Taxes were levied on agriculture, livestock, and trade, and were often collected through local intermediaries and military detachments, frequently using violence and intimidation. In years of drought or famine, these burdens led to widespread displacement and social disruption.

Many inhabitants of the Nile Valley migrated toward Kordofan and Darfur to escape taxation and conscription. There, they increasingly engaged in commerce and caravan trade. From this environment emerged the jallāba, a merchant class specializing in long-distance trade, credit, and brokerage between local producers and external markets. The term jallāba referred to an economic and social category rather than an ethnic group or tribe.

A significant proportion of the jallāba were involved in the slave trade, which remained a major component of Sudan's economy during the Turco-Egyptian period. Slaves were exported north to Egypt and the Mediterranean world, as well as used internally for agriculture, military service, and domestic labor.

By the mid-19th century, Egypt was ruled by Isma'il Pasha of Egypt. His ambitious modernization projects, including the construction of the Suez Canal, plunged Egypt into massive foreign debt. In 1876, Britain and France imposed the Caisse de la Dette Publique, an international financial commission that took control of Egypt's revenues. This foreign intervention undermined Ismail's authority and led to his forced abdication in 1879 in favor of his son Tewfik Pasha.

In 1873, Ismail appointed General Charles George Gordon as Governor of the Equatorial Provinces of Sudan, later expanding his authority to include Darfur. Gordon attempted to suppress the slave trade and defeat the powerful trader-warlord al-Zubayr Rahma Mansur, whose commercial empire dominated much of western Sudan.

After Ismail's abdication, Gordon's political support and financial resources collapsed. He resigned in 1880 and left Sudan in early 1881. His reforms were largely abandoned by subsequent administrators, and the resentment of merchants, tribal leaders, religious figures, and rural populations toward Turco-Egyptian rule continued to intensify.

Although conditions in Sudan deteriorated rapidly, the British government refused to assume direct responsibility. Foreign Secretary Earl Granville declared that "Her Majesty's Government are in no way responsible for operations in the Sudan," reflecting Britain's desire to control Egypt without becoming militarily entangled in its African possessions.

== History ==
=== Mahdi uprising ===
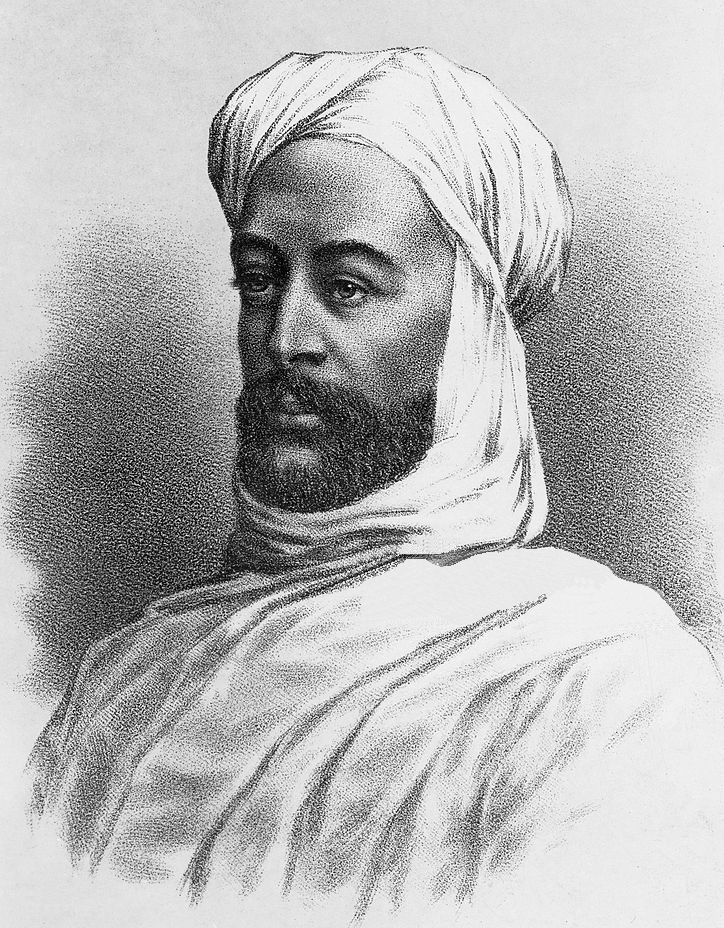
Muhammad Ahmad, the self-proclaimed Mahdi

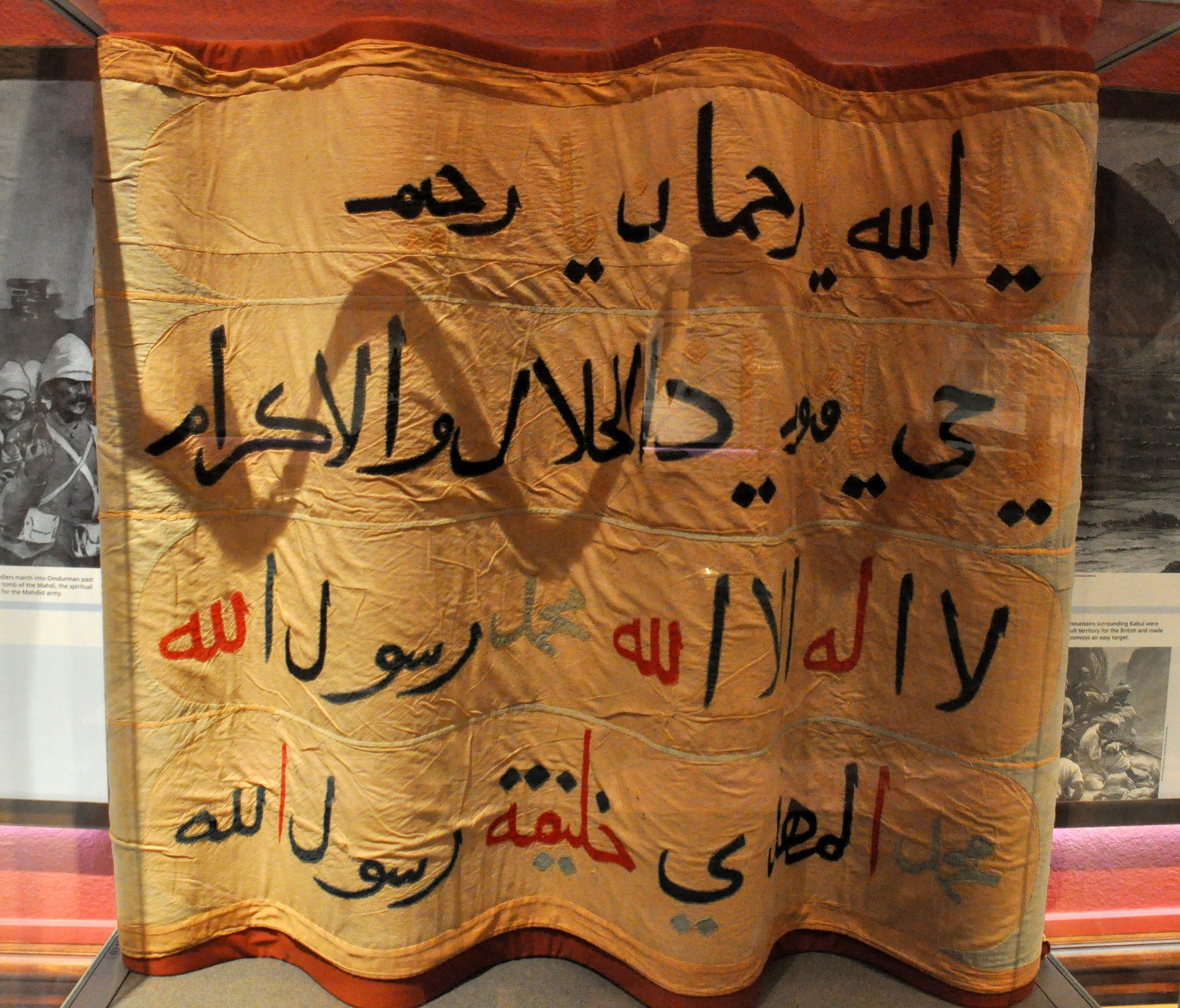
This banner is a declaration of faith and allegiance into Allah, and was carried into battle by the Sudanese Mahdist Army. The color of the banner identifies the fighting unit. From Omdurman, 1898. The Kelvingrove Art Gallery and Museum, Glasgow, UK. Given by Miss Victoria MacBean, 1929.

Among the forces seen as the causes of the uprising were ethnic Sudanese anger at the foreign Egyptian rulers, Muslim revivalist anger at the Egyptian's lax religious standards and willingness to appoint non-Muslims such as the Christian Charles Gordon to high positions, and Sudanese Sufi resistance to "dry, scholastic Islam of Egyptian officialdom." Another widely reported source of frustration was the Egyptian abolition of the slave trade, one of the main sources of income in Sudan at the time.

In the 1870s, a Muslim cleric named Muhammad Ahmad preached renewal of the faith and liberation of the land, and began attracting followers. Soon in open revolt against the Egyptians, Muhammad Ahmad proclaimed himself the Mahdi, the promised redeemer of the Islamic world. In August 1881 the then-governor of the Sudan, Rauf Pasha, sent two companies of infantry each with one machine gun to arrest him. The captains of the two companies were each promised promotion if their soldiers were the ones to return the Mahdi to the governor. Both companies disembarked from the steamer that had brought them up the Nile to Aba Island and approached the Mahdi's village from separate directions. Arriving simultaneously, each force began to fire blindly on the other, allowing the Mahdi's scant followers to attack and destroy each force in turn at the Battle of Aba.

The Mahdi then began a strategic retreat to Kordofan, where he was at a distance from the seat of government in Khartoum. This movement, posed as a triumphant progress, incited many of the Arab tribes to rise in support of the Jihad the Mahdi had declared against the Egyptian government.

The Mahdi and the forces of his Ansar arrived in the Nuba Mountains of south Kordofan around early November 1881. Another Egyptian expedition dispatched from Fashoda arrived around one month later; this force was ambushed and slaughtered on the night of 9 December 1881. Like the earlier Aba Island force, this force consisted of two 200 man strong Egyptian raised infantry companies, this time augmented with an additional 1,000 native irregulars, the force commander – Colonel Rashid Bay Ahman – and all his principal leadership team were killed. It is unknown if any of Colonel Ahman's troops survived.

As these military incursions were happening, the Mahdi legitimized his movement by drawing deliberate parallels to the life of Muhammad. He called his followers Ansar, after the people who greeted Muhammad in Medina, and he called his flight from the British, the hijrah, after Muhammad's flight from the Quraysh. The Mahdi also appointed commanders to represent three of the four Righteous Caliphs; for example, he announced that Abdullahi ibn Muhammad, his eventual successor, represented Abu Bakr Al Sidiq, Muhammad's successor.

The Egyptian administration in the Sudan, now thoroughly concerned by the scale of the uprising, assembled a force of 4,000 troops under Yusef Pasha. In mid-1882, this force approached the Mahdist gathering, whose members were poorly clothed, half starving, and armed only with sticks and stones. However, supreme overconfidence led the Egyptian army into camping within sight of the Mahdist 'army' without posting sentries. The Mahdi led a dawn assault on 7 June 1882, which slaughtered the entire army. The rebels gained vast stores of arms, ammunition, military clothing and other supplies.

=== Hicks expedition ===
With the Egyptian government now passing largely under British control, the European powers became increasingly aware of the troubles in Sudan. The British advisers to the Egyptian government gave tacit consent for another expedition. Throughout the summer of 1883, Egyptian troops were concentrated at Khartoum, eventually reaching the strength of around 7,300 infantry, 1,000 cavalry, and an artillery force of 300 personnel hauling between them 4 Krupp 80mm field guns, 10 brass mountain guns and 6 Nordenfelt guns. This force was placed under the command of retired Bombay Army colonel William Hicks and twelve European officers. The force was, in the words of Winston Churchill, "perhaps the worst army that has ever marched to war". Unpaid, untrained, and undisciplined, its soldiers having more in common with their enemies than with their officers.

El-Obeid, the city whose siege Hicks had intended to relieve, had already fallen by the time the expedition left Khartoum, but Hicks continued anyway, although not confident of his chances of success. Upon his approach, the Mahdi assembled an army of about 40,000 men and drilled them rigorously in the art of war, equipping them with the arms and ammunition captured in previous battles. On 3 and 4 November 1883, when Hicks' forces offered battle, the Mahdist army was a credible military force, which defeated Hicks' army with only about 500 Egyptians surviving the Battle of Shaykan.

=== Egyptian evacuation ===
At this time, the British Empire was increasingly entrenching itself in the workings of the Egyptian government. Egypt was struggling under a barely maintainable debt repayment structure for its enormous European debt. For the Egyptian government to avoid further interference from its European creditors, it had to ensure that the debt interest was paid on time, every time. To this end, the Egyptian treasury, initially crippled by corruption and bureaucracy, was placed by the British almost entirely under the control of a financial advisor, who exercised the power of veto over all matters of financial policy. The holders of this office, first Sir Auckland Colvin, and later Sir Edgar Vincent—were instructed to be as frugal possible in Egypt's financial affairs. Maintaining the garrisons in the Sudan was costing the Egyptian government over 100,000 Egyptian pounds a year, an unmaintainable expense.

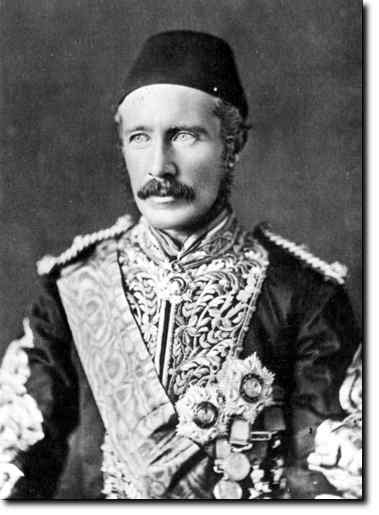
Charles Gordon as Governor of the Sudan

It was therefore decided by the Egyptian government, under pressure from their British advisors, that the Egyptian presence in Sudan should be withdrawn and the country left to some form of self-government, likely headed by the Mahdi. The withdrawal of the Egyptian garrisons stationed throughout the country, such as those at Sennar, Tokar and Sinkat, was therefore threatened unless it was conducted in an orderly fashion. The Egyptian government, through British Consul-general in Egypt Sir Evelyn Baring (later the Earl of Cromer), asked for a British officer to be sent to the Sudan to co-ordinate the withdrawal of the garrisons. It was hoped that Mahdist forces would judge an attack on a British subject to be too great a risk, and hence allow the withdrawal to proceed without incident. The British government proposed to send Charles Gordon. Gordon was a gifted officer, who had gained renown commanding Imperial Chinese forces during the Taiping Rebellion. However, he was also renowned for his aggression and rigid personal honour, which, in the eyes of several prominent British officials in Egypt, made him unsuitable for the task. Sir Evelyn Baring was particularly opposed to Gordon's appointment, but was overruled by Secretary of State for Foreign Affairs, Earl Granville. Gordon was eventually given the mission, but he was to be accompanied by the much more level-headed and reliable Colonel John Stewart. It was intended that Stewart, while nominally Gordon's subordinate, would act as a brake on the latter and ensure that Sudan was evacuated quickly and peacefully.

Gordon left England on 18 January 1884 and arrived in Cairo on the evening of 24 January. Gordon was largely responsible for drafting his own orders, along with proclamations from the Khedive announcing Egypt's intentions to leave Sudan. Gordon's orders, by his own request, were unambiguous, leaving little room for misinterpretation.

Gordons orders were: 1) to evacuate all Egyptian garrisons from Sudan (including both soldiers and civilians) and 2) to leave some form of indigenous (but not Mahdist) government behind him. He was given no timeline for either.

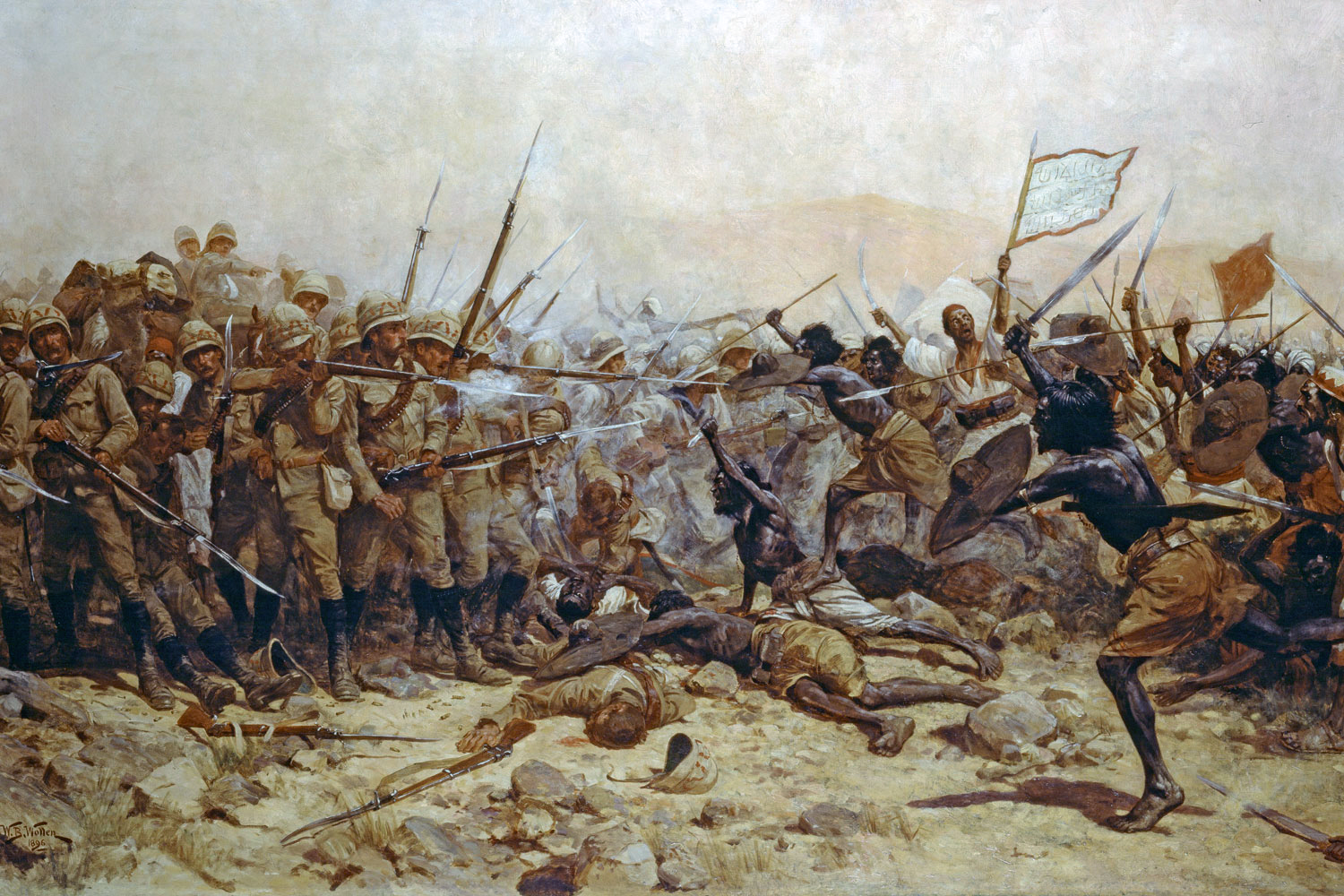
The Battle of Abu Klea, which took place during the desert expedition to bring relief to Gordon, besieged in Khartoum, 1885

Gordon arrived in Khartoum on 18 February, and immediately became aware of the vast difficulty of the task. Egypt's garrisons were scattered widely across the country; three—Sennar, Tokar and Sinkat—were under siege, and the majority of the territory between them was under the control of the Mahdi. There was no guarantee that, if the garrisons were to sortie, even with the clear intention of withdrawing, they would not be defeated by the Mahdist forces. Khartoum's Egyptian and European population was greater than all the other garrisons combined, including 7,000 Egyptian troops and 27,000 civilians and the staffs of several embassies. Although the pragmatic approach would have been to secure the safety of the Khartoum garrison and abandon the outlying fortifications and their troops to the Mahdi, Gordon became increasingly reluctant to leave the Sudan until "every one who wants to go down [the Nile] is given the chance to do so," feeling it would be a slight on his honour to abandon any Egyptian soldiers to the Mahdi. He also became increasingly fearful of the Mahdi's potential to cause trouble in Egypt if allowed control of Sudan, leading to a conviction that the Mahdi must be "crushed," by British troops if necessary, to assure the stability of the region. It is debated whether or not Gordon deliberately remained in Khartoum longer than strategically sensible, seemingly intent on becoming besieged within the town. Gordon's brother, H. W. Gordon, was of the opinion that the British officers could easily have escaped from Khartoum up until 14 December 1884.

Whether or not it was the Mahdi's intention, in March 1884, the Sudanese tribes to the north of Khartoum, who had previously been sympathetic or neutral towards the Egyptian authorities, rose in support of the Mahdi. The telegraph lines between Khartoum and Cairo were cut on 15 March, severing communication between Khartoum and the outside world.

=== Siege of Khartoum ===
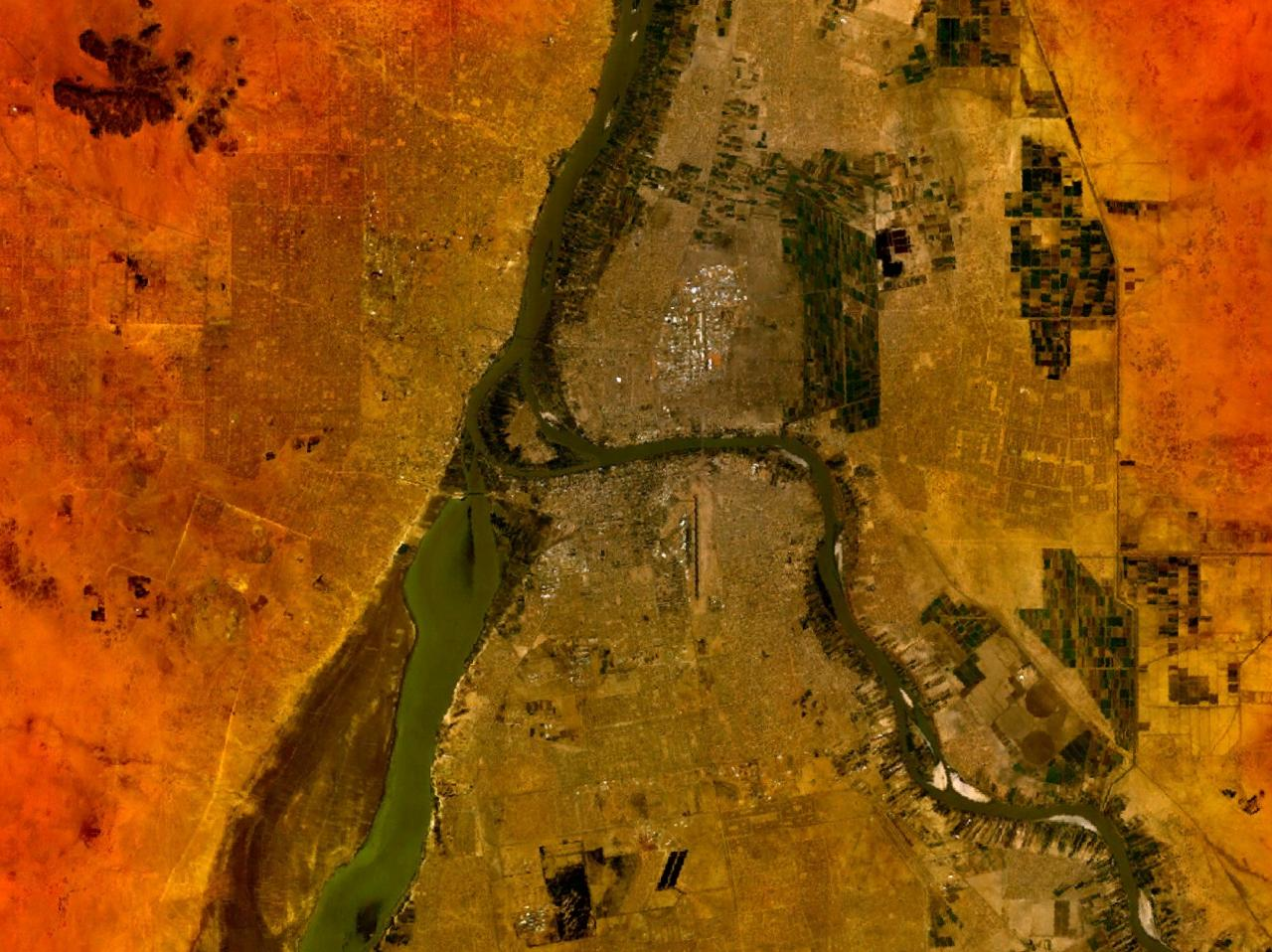
An aerial view of the confluence of the Nile rivers. Khartoum lies between the two rivers, with Omdurman on the west bank slightly downstream.

Gordon's position in Khartoum was very strong, as the city was bordered to the north and east by the Blue Nile, to the west by the White Nile, and to the south by fortifications (dry ditch and ramparts constructed by Gordon's predecessor, colonel De Coetlogon) looking on to a vast expanse of desert. Gordon had food for an estimated six months, several million rounds of ammunition in store, with the capacity to produce a further 50,000 rounds per week, and 7,000 Egyptian soldiers. But outside the walls, the Mahdi had mustered about 50,000 Dervish soldiers, and as time went on, the chances of a successful breakout became slim. Gordon had enthusiastically supported the idea of recalling the notorious former slaver Al-Zubayr Rahma from exile in Egypt to organize and lead a popular uprising against the Mahdi. When this idea was vetoed by the British government, Gordon proposed a number of alternative means to salvage his situation successively to his British superiors. All were similarly vetoed. Among them were:

- Making a breakout southwards along the Blue Nile towards Ethiopia, which would have enabled him to collect the garrisons stationed along that route. The window for navigation of the upper reaches of the Blue Nile was very narrow.
- Requesting Mohammedan regiments from India.
- Requesting several thousand Turkish troops be sent to quell the uprising.
- Visiting the Mahdi himself to explore a possible solution.

Eventually it became impossible for Gordon to be relieved without British troops. An expedition was duly dispatched under Sir Garnet Wolseley, but as the level of the White Nile fell through the winter, muddy 'beaches' at the foot of the walls were exposed. With starvation and cholera rampant in the city and the Egyptian troops' morale shattered, Gordon's position became untenable and the city fell on 26 January 1885, after a siege of 313 days.

=== Nile campaign ===
The British Government, under strong pressure from the public, reluctantly sent a relief column of 9,000 soldiers under Sir Garnet Wolseley to relieve the Khartoum garrison. The column would be joined by 400 Canadian voyageurs. This was described in some British papers as the 'Gordon Relief Expedition', a term Gordon strongly objected to. To reach Khartoum faster, the relief column was split in two – the River Column and the Desert Column. After defeating the Mahdists at Abu Klea and Abu Kru in mid-January 1885, the relief column arrived within sight of Khartoum at the end of January, only to find they were too late: the city had fallen two days earlier, and Gordon and the garrison had been massacred.

=== Suakin Expedition ===
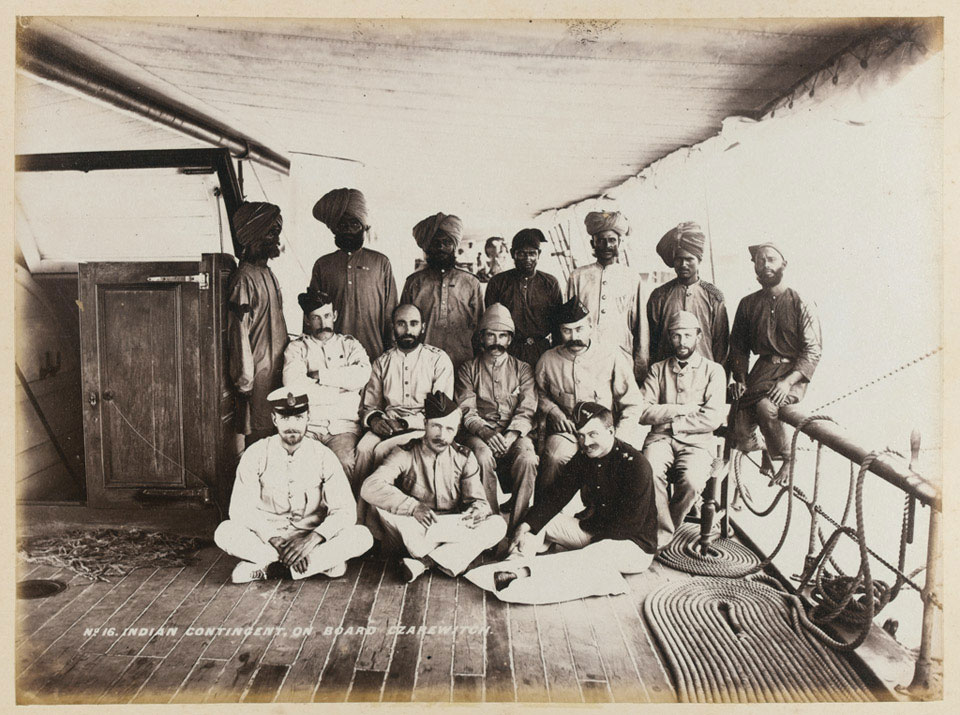
Indian Army troops en route to Sudan to help defend remaining Anglo-Egyptian outposts, 1884.

The British also sent an expeditionary force under Lieutenant-General Sir Gerald Graham, including an Indian contingent, to Suakin in March 1885. Though successful in the two actions it fought, it failed to change the military situation and was withdrawn. These events temporarily ended British and Egyptian involvement in Sudan, which passed completely under the control of the Mahdists.

Muhammad Ahmad died soon after his victory, on 22 June 1885, and was succeeded by the Khalifa Abdallahi ibn Muhammad, who proved to be an able, albeit ruthless, ruler of the Mahdist State.

=== Equatoria expedition ===
Between 1886 and 1889 a British expedition to relieve the Egyptian governor of Equatoria made its way through central Africa. The governor, Emin Pasha, was rescued, though the expedition was not without its failures, such as the disaster that befell the rear column.

=== Ethiopian campaigns ===
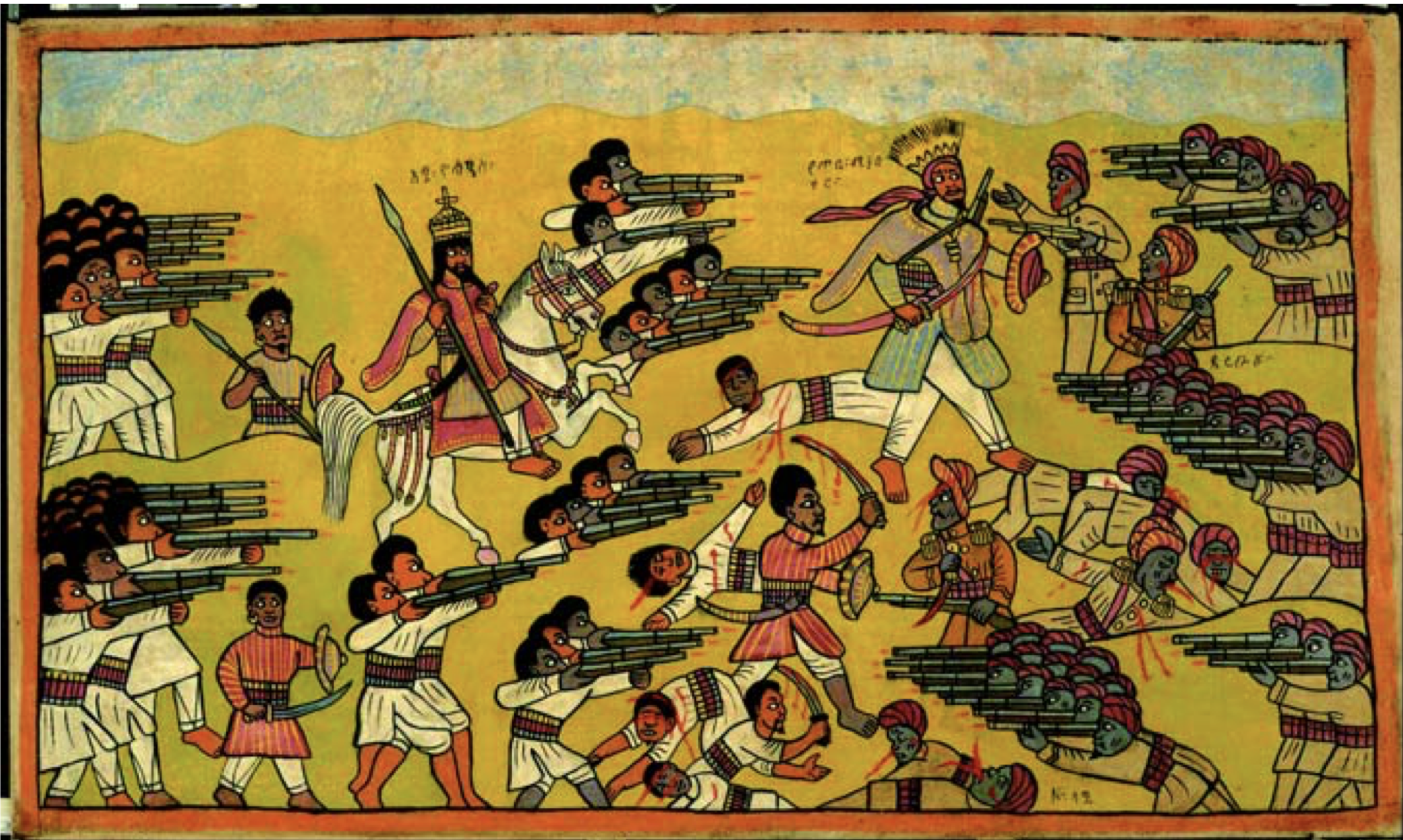
The Battle of Gallabat between Emperor Yohannes against the Mahdists.

According to the Hewett Treaty of 3 June 1884, Ethiopia agreed to facilitate the evacuation of Egyptian garrisons in southern Sudan. In September 1884, Ethiopia reoccupied the province of Bogos, which had been occupied by Egypt, and began a long campaign to relieve the Egyptian garrisons besieged by the Mahdists. The bitter campaigning was led by the Emperor Yohannes IV and Ras Alula. The Ethiopians under Ras Alula achieved a victory in the Battle of Kufit on 23 September 1885.

Between November 1885 and February 1886, Yohannes IV was putting down a revolt in Wollo. In January 1886, a Mahdist army invaded Ethiopia, seized Dembea, burned the Mahbere Selassie monastery and advanced on Chilga. King Tekle Haymanot of Gojjam led a successful counteroffensive as far as Gallabat in Sudan in January 1887. A year later, in January 1888, the Mahdists returned, defeating Tekle Haymanot at Sar Weha and sacking Gondar. This culminated in the end of the Ethiopian theatre at the Battle of Gallabat.

=== Italian campaign and Anglo-Egyptian reconquest ===
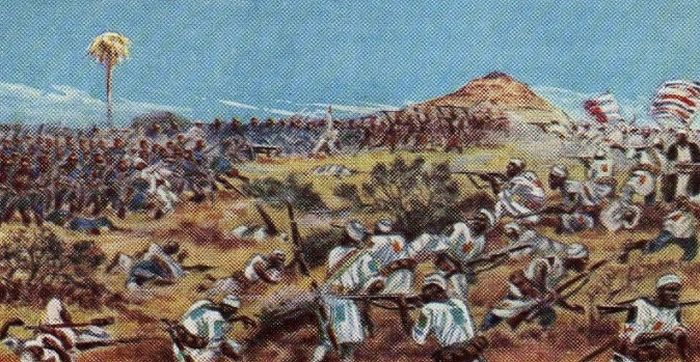
Troops from the Congo Free State defeating Mahdist troops at the Battle of Rejaf

In the intervening years, Egypt had not renounced their claims over Sudan, and the British authorities considered these claims legitimate. Under strict control by British administrators, Egypt's economy had been rebuilt, and the Egyptian army reformed, this time trained and led by British officers and non-commissioned officers. The situation evolved in a way that allowed Egypt, both politically and militarily, to reconquer Sudan.

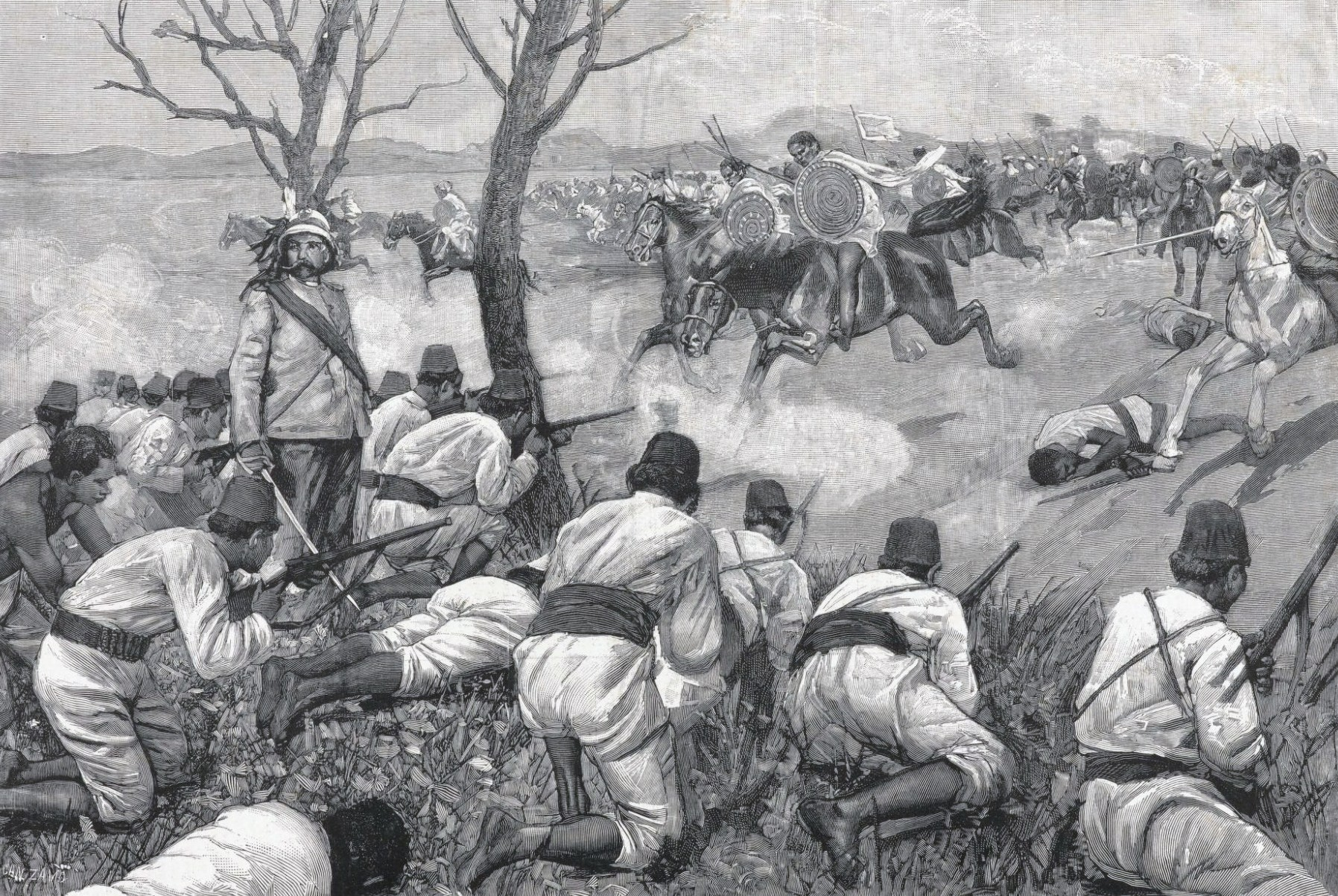
Italian Askaris fighting Mahdist troops in Tucruf.

Since 1890, Italian troops had defeated Mahdist troops in the Battle of Serobeti and the First Battle of Agordat. In December 1893, Italian colonial troops and Mahdists fought again in the Second Battle of Agordat; Ahmed Ali campaigned against the Italian forces in eastern Sudan and led about 10,000–12,000 men east from Kassala, encountering 2,400 Italians and their Eritrean Ascaris commanded by Colonel Arimondi. The Italians won again, and the outcome of the battle constituted "the first decisive victory yet won by Europeans against the Sudanese revolutionaries". A year later, Italian colonial forces seized Kassala after the successful Battle of Kassala.

In 1891 a Catholic priest, Father Joseph Ohrwalder, escaped from captivity in Sudan. In 1895 the former Governor of Darfur, Rudolf Carl von Slatin, managed to escape from the Khalifa's prison. Besides providing vital intelligence on the Mahdist dispositions, both men wrote detailed accounts of their experiences in Sudan. Written in collaboration with Reginald Wingate, a proponent of the reconquest of Sudan, both works emphasized the savagery and barbarism of the Mahdists, and through the wide publicity they received in Britain, served to influence public opinion in favour of military intervention.

In 1896, when Italy suffered a heavy defeat at the hands of the Ethiopians at Adwa, the Italian position in East Africa was seriously weakened. The Mahdists threatened to retake Kassala, which they had lost to the Italians in 1894. The British government decided to assist the Italians by making a military demonstration in northern Sudan. This coincided with the increased threat of French encroachment on the Upper Nile regions. Lord Cromer, judging that the Conservative-Unionist government in power would favour taking the offensive, managed to extend the demonstration into a full-fledged invasion. In 1897, the Italians gave the British control of Kassala, in order to gain international recognition of Italian Eritrea.

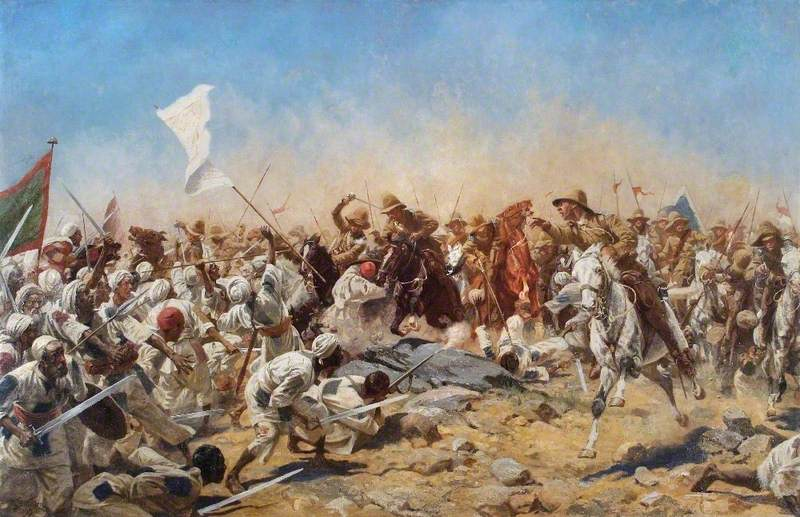
Charge of the 21st Lancers at the Battle of Omdurman, 2 September 1898

Herbert Kitchener, the new Sirdar (commander) of the Anglo-Egyptian Army, received his marching orders on 12 March, and his forces entered Sudan on the 18th. Numbering at first 11,000 men, Kitchener's force was armed with the most modern military equipment of the time, including Maxim machine-guns and modern artillery, and was supported by a flotilla of gunboats on the Nile. Their advance was slow and methodical, while fortified camps were built along the way, and two separate 3 ft 6 in (1,067 mm) Narrow gauge railways were hastily constructed from a station at Wadi Halfa: the first rebuilt Isma'il Pasha's abortive and ruined former line south along the east bank of the Nile to supply the 1896 Dongola Expedition (Note: This line was so out of the way, badly sited, and hastily rebuilt that it was abandoned in 1904. The Abu Hamad route, however, became the start of the entire subsequent Sudanese rail network. The Cape gauge hastily adopted to use the available rolling stock provided from South Africa meant that the Sudanese system could not (and still cannot) link directly to Egypt's standard-gauge system but required transshipment via steamer from Asyut to Halfa.) and a second, carried out in 1897, was extended along a new line directly across the desert to Abu Hamad—which they captured in the Battle of Abu Hamed on 7 August 1897—to supply the main force moving on Khartoum. It was not until 7 June 1896 that the first serious engagement of the campaign occurred, when Kitchener led a 9,000 strong force that wiped out the Mahdist garrison at Ferkeh.

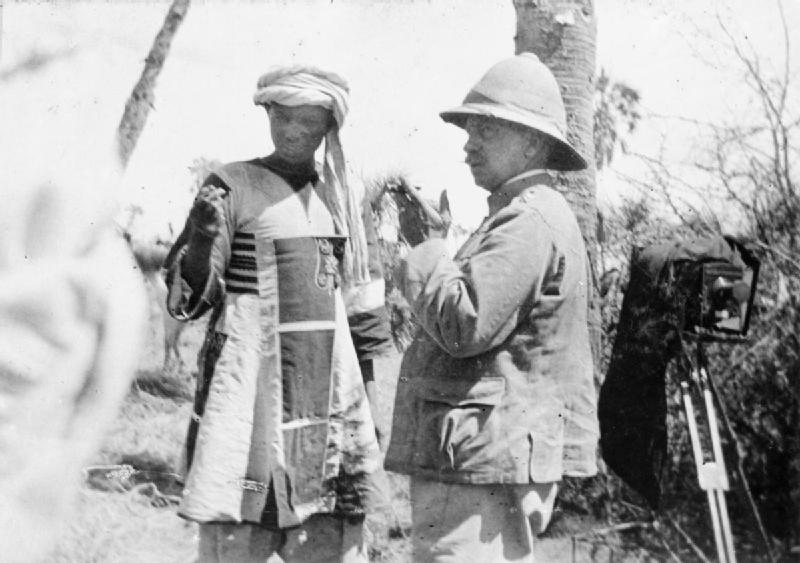
The defeated Emir Mahmud with the British Director of Military Intelligence Francis Wingate after the 1898 Battle of Atbara

In 1898, in the context of the scramble for Africa, the British decided to reassert Egypt's claim on Sudan. An expedition commanded by Kitchener was organised in Egypt. It was composed of 8,200 British soldiers and 17,600 Egyptian and Sudanese soldiers commanded by British officers. The Mahdist forces were more numerous, numbering more than 60,000 warriors, but lacked modern weapons.

After defeating a Mahdist force in the Battle of Atbara in April 1898, the Anglo-Egyptians reached Omdurman, the Mahdist capital, on 2 September. The bulk of the Mahdist army attacked, but was cut down by British machine-guns and rifle fire.

The remnant, with the Khalifa Abdullah, fled to southern Sudan. During the pursuit, Kitchener's forces met a French force under Major Jean-Baptiste Marchand at Fashoda, resulting in the Fashoda Incident. They finally caught up with Abdullah at Umm Diwaykarat, where he was killed, effectively ending the Mahdist regime.

The casualties for this campaign were:

Sudan: 30,000 dead, wounded, or captured
Britain: 700+ British, Egyptian and Sudanese dead, wounded, or captured.

== Aftermath ==
The British set up a new colonial system, the Anglo-Egyptian administration, which effectively established British domination over Sudan. This ended with the independence of Sudan in 1956. The Tukrir sided with the Mahdists during their war against Ethiopia and disappeared with their defeat.

== Military textiles of the Mahdiyya ==
Textiles played an important role in the organisation of the Mahdist forces. The flags, banners, and patched tunics (jibba) worn and used in battle by the anṣār had both military and religious significance. As a result, textile items like these make up a large portion of the booty which was taken back to Britain after the British victory over the Mahdist forces at the Battle of Omdurman in 1899. Mahdist flags and jibbas were adapted from traditional styles of textiles used by adherents of Sufi orders in Sudan. As the Mahdist War progressed, these textiles became more standardised and specifically colour coded to denote military rank and regiment.

=== Mahdist flags ===
Flag of the Mahdi movement in Sudan

Sufi flags typically feature the Muslim shahada – "There is no God but Allah; Muḥammad is Allah's Messenger" – and the name of the sect's founder, an individual usually regarded as a saint. The Mahdi adapted this form of flag for military purposes. A quotation from the Quran was added "Yā allah yā ḥayy yā qayūm yā ḍhi’l-jalāl wa’l-ikrām" (O Allah! O Ever-living, O Everlasting, O Lord of Majesty and Generosity) and the highly charged claim "Muḥammad al-Mahdī khalifat rasūl Allah" (Muḥammad al-Mahdī is the successor of Allah's messenger).

After the fall of Khartoum, a "Tailor of Flags" was set up in Omdurman. The production of flags became standardised and regulations concerning the colour and inscriptions of the flags were established. As the Mahdist forces became more organized, the word "flag" (rayya) came to mean a division of troops or a body of troops under a commander. The flags were colour coded to direct soldiers of the three main divisions of the Mahdist army – the Black, Green and Red Banners (rāyāt).

=== The Mahdist jibba ===
The patched muraqqa'a, and later, the jibba, was a garment traditionally worn by followers of Sufi religious orders. The ragged, patched garment symbolised a rejection of material wealth by its wearer and a commitment to a religious way of life. Muhammad Ahmad al-Mahdi decreed that this garment should be worn by all his soldiers in battle. The decision to adopt the religious garment as military dress enforced unity and cohesion among his forces, and eliminated traditional visual markers differentiating potentially fractious tribes. During the years of conflict between Mahdist and Anglo-Egyptian forces at the end of the 19th century, the Mahdist military jibba became increasingly stylised and patches became colour-coded to denote the rank and military division of the wearer.

== Film adaptations ==
- The Four Feathers (1939) for the Battle of Omdurman
- The Four Feathers (2002) for the Battle of Abu Klea
- Khartoum (1966) for the Battle of Shaykan, Battle of Abu Klea, and Siege of Khartoum

== See also ==
- Anfila
- List of journalists killed during the Mahdist War
- List of wars involving Sudan
- Mahdist State
- Millenarianism in colonial societies
- Sudan Military Railroad
