= Sellal =

Sellal is a surname. Notable people with the surname include:

- Abdelmalek Sellal (born 1948), Algerian politician
- Abdelhamid Sellal (fl. 1972–73), Algerian footballer and manager
