= Battle of Kassala =

Military engagement (1894)

- Part of the Mahdist War
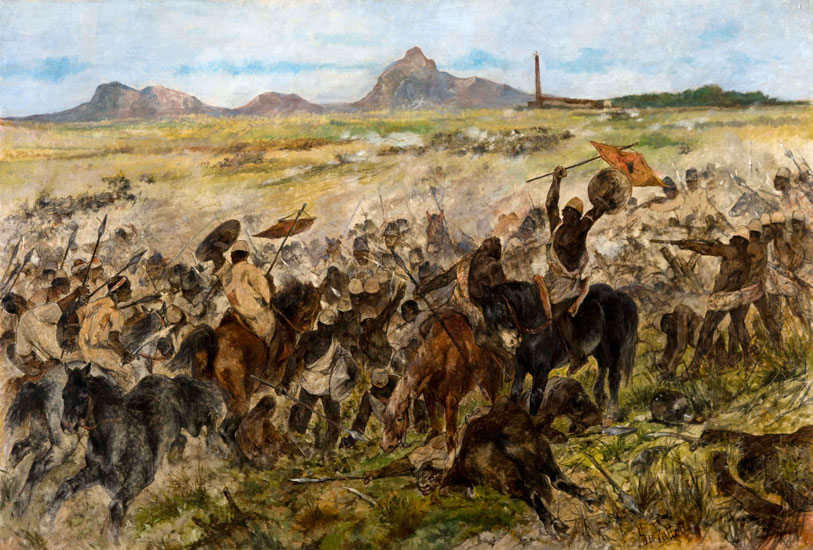
- 1906 painting of the battle by Giovanni Fattori
Date	17 July 1894
Location	Kassala, Mahdist Sudan
Result	Colonial Italian victory
Territorial changes	The Italian forces seize Kassala

Belligerents
Kingdom of Italy: (Kingdom of Italy) Colony of Eritrea	Mahdist Sudan

Commanders and leaders
Oreste Baratieri; Captain Francesco Carchidio Malvolti †	Mussaed Gaidum (Emir of Kassala)

Strength
56 Italian officers 41 Italian NCOs; 2,526 native soldiers	2,500 Mahdist infantry 600 Baqqara cavalry

Casualties and losses
28 killed 41 wounded	1,400 dead & wounded hundreds were killed and drowned

The Battle of Kassala was fought on July 17, 1894, between Italian colonial troops and Mahdist Sudanese forces.

== Prelude ==
Governor Oreste Baratieri sought to capture Kassala, to forestall Mahdist attacks on Eritrea. In July 1894, Baratieri saw his moment when the Atbarah River started to rise, and marched his small army of "56 Italian officers, 41 NCOs and 2510 native soldiers led by 16 Bukbashis" towards Kassala.

== Battle ==
An account of the capture of Kassala was published in The New York Times on July 20, 1894:

" Rome, July 19.- ...The attack upon the earthworks of the Mahdists was at once ordered and a fiercely contested battle ensued. The Mahdists fought desperately, but were finally driven from their position, leaving hundreds of dead and wounded in and about the intrenchments. Being hotly pursued, the Mahdists scattered under a continuous fire, and many of them in their efforts to escape plunged into the River Adbara, hoping to reach the other side. ...Hundreds of the enemy were drowned, and it is believed that none succeeded in reaching the opposite bank."

== Aftermath ==
The Italians captured two flags and a number of cannons, in addition the Italians freed captured people, including "several white men and about a hundred of the remnants of the former Egyptian garrison; also a number from the tribes around."

On July 23 the General Oreste Baratieri left, leaving a garrison of a thousand men with two guns under Colonel Turitto. Three years later, in 1897, the Italians gave control of Kassala back to the British, in order to get international recognition of their colony of Eritrea. The Italian forces that were in Kassala returned to Eritrea.
