= Abu Hamad =

Abu Hamad أبو حمد
- Town
- Location in Sudan
- Coordinates: 19°32′36″N 33°20′16″E
- Country: Sudan
- State: River Nile

Population (2022)
  - Total: 69 059
  - Density: 23,019/km^{2} (59,620/sq mi)

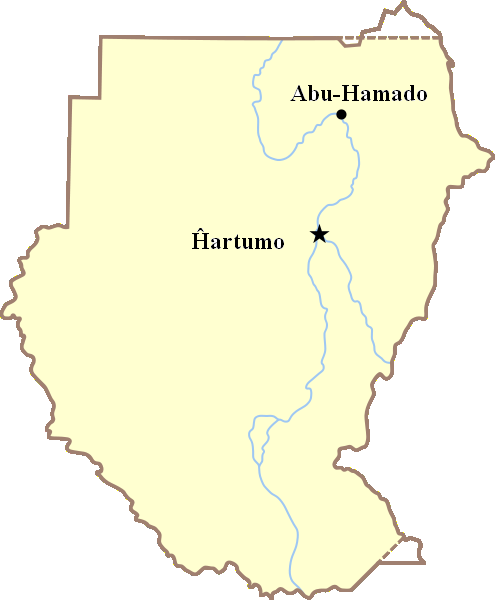
Map of the Abu-Hamado region.

Abu Hamad (Arabic: أبو حمد, Sudanese Arabic: [abuˈħamad]), also spelled Abu Hamed, is a town of Sudan on the right bank of the Nile, 345 mi (555 km) by rail north of Khartoum. It stands at the centre of the great S-shaped bend of the Nile, and from it the railway to Wadi Halfa strikes straight across the Nubian Desert, a little west of the old caravan route to Korosko. The population of Abu Hamad is 69,056. A branch railway, 138 mi (222 km) long, from Abu Hamad goes down the right bank of the Nile to Karima in the Dongola mudiria.

A 19th-century traveler described the town:

Abou-Hammed is a miserable village, inhabited by a few hundred Ababdehs and Bishàrees; the desert here extended to the water's edge, while the opposite banks were as green as emerald. There was a large mud fortress, with round bastions at the corners, to the west of the village. It formerly belonged to an Ababdeh shekh [sic] but was then deserted.

The town is named after a celebrated sheikh buried here, by whose tomb travellers crossing the desert used formerly to deposit all superfluous goods, the sanctity of the saint's tomb ensuring their safety.

The Battle of Abu Hamed, a part of the Anglo-Egyptian reconquest of the Sudan, took place near the town on 7 August 1897.

== Transport ==
In 2023 a new road 450 km long from Abu Hamad to the site of a proposed sea port at abu Amama about 200 km north of Port Sudan.

== Climate ==
Abu Hamad has an extremely hot and arid desert climate (Köppen climate classification BWh). Summers are long and extremely hot, and winters are warm. Throughout the year, humidity levels are low, and sunshine levels are high.

Climate data for Abu Hamad (1991–2020, extremes 1909–present)
Month	Jan	Feb	Mar	Apr	May	Jun	Jul	Aug	Sep	Oct	Nov	Dec	Year
Record high °C (°F)	39.7 (103.5)	41.2 (106.2)	46 (115)	47.0 (116.6)	48.0 (118.4)	49.0 (120.2)	49.5 (121.1)	49 (120)	47.0 (116.6)	45.0 (113.0)	43 (109)	39.5 (103.1)	49.5 (121.1)
Mean daily maximum °C (°F)	28.9 (84.0)	31.3 (88.3)	35.1 (95.2)	39.7 (103.5)	42.7 (108.9)	44.1 (111.4)	42.9 (109.2)	43.0 (109.4)	43.2 (109.8)	40.2 (104.4)	34.4 (93.9)	30.1 (86.2)	38.0 (100.4)
Daily mean °C (°F)	20.8 (69.4)	22.8 (73.0)	26.2 (79.2)	30.8 (87.4)	34.3 (93.7)	35.8 (96.4)	35.4 (95.7)	35.9 (96.6)	35.7 (96.3)	32.6 (90.7)	27.0 (80.6)	22.4 (72.3)	30.0 (86.0)
Mean daily minimum °C (°F)	12.8 (55.0)	14.3 (57.7)	17.4 (63.3)	21.8 (71.2)	26.0 (78.8)	27.6 (81.7)	27.8 (82.0)	28.8 (83.8)	28.2 (82.8)	24.9 (76.8)	19.6 (67.3)	14.7 (58.5)	22.0 (71.6)
Record low °C (°F)	4.1 (39.4)	4.5 (40.1)	7.8 (46.0)	11.8 (53.2)	12.7 (54.9)	19.5 (67.1)	20.0 (68.0)	20.0 (68.0)	18.9 (66.0)	13.8 (56.8)	7.5 (45.5)	5.3 (41.5)	4.1 (39.4)
Average precipitation mm (inches)	0.0 (0.0)	0.0 (0.0)	0.0 (0.0)	0.1 (0.00)	0.5 (0.02)	0.0 (0.0)	4.4 (0.17)	6.0 (0.24)	1.0 (0.04)	0.7 (0.03)	0.0 (0.0)	0.0 (0.0)	12.7 (0.50)
Average precipitation days (≥ 1.0 mm)	0.0	0.0	0.0	0.0	0.1	0.0	0.5	0.7	0.2	0.1	0.0	0.0	1.7
Average relative humidity (%)	33	26	20	17	17	16	22	25	21	24	30	35	24
Mean monthly sunshine hours	306.9	285.6	319.3	318.0	325.5	321.0	319.3	297.6	267.0	325.5	306.0	313.1	3,704.8
Source 1: NOAA
Source 2: Meteo Climat (record highs and lows)

== See also ==
- Mograt Island
