= Hamaj Regency =

Principality in Sudan from 1762 to 1821

The Hamaj Regency (Arabic: وصاية ٱلهمج wiṣāyat ul-Hamaj) was a political order in modern-day central Sudan from 1762 to 1821. During this period the ruling family of the Funj Sultanate of Sennar continued to reign, while actual power was exercised by the regents.

== Origins ==
The Shankalla were people from the upper Blue Nile, between Sennar and Ethiopia. They predate the arrival of the Arabs in that part of Sudan, and are considered by some to be part of the Shilluk group of peoples. Their language is part of the Koman branch of the Sudan linguistic family. They were often the targets of Funj slave raids, and the term 'hamaj' was a derogatory term (meaning 'riffraff') used by the Funj to describe them. The Hamaj were incorporated into the Funj Sultanate of Sennar in the seventeenth century. Funj society was strictly divided by skin colour and other physical characteristics. The Funj classified themselves as 'blue' (Arabic: ازرق azraq) and they described the Hamaj as 'red' (Arabic: احمر aḥmar). According to the Funj Chronicle, a slave called Hamaj settled in Sennar along with his extended family, where they prospered and 'increased greatly until they had the power and the prestige in the kingdom.

== Seizure of Power ==
The Hamaj came to power during the reign of Sultan Badi IV. He made himself unpopular among the ruling elite by distributing lands of old established families to his new non-Funj followers — Nuba and others. This continued a policy advanced by some of his predecessors, of relying less on the traditional Funj military aristocracy and more on slave armies. Badi placed his military forces under the command of the Hamaj general Muhammad Abu Likayik, whom he had appointed as governor of Kordofan in 1747. When news of Badi's increasingly arbitrary rule reached the Funj armies in Kordofan, they agreed to depose him under the leadership of Abu Likayik. They crossed the White Nile back into core Funj territory at Alays, where they were joined by Badi's son Nasir. They advanced on Sennar and surrounded it, but agreed to allow Badi to leave under an amnesty. Abu Likaylik then installed Nasir as sultan, and the regency began.

== Hamaj rule ==
The sixty years of the Hamaj regency were characterised by constant internal strife, both between the Hamaj and the Funj sultans, and between different members of Abu Likayik's family.

Eight years after he had installed Nasir as sultan, Abu Likayik removed him and banished him. When he learned that Nasir was conspiring to regain his throne, he had him executed. When Abu Likayik died in 1776 or 1777 he was replaced as regent by his brother, Badi walad Rajab. Once again the ruling Funj sultan, now Ismail, conspired unsuccessfully to remove the regent. Ismail was banished to Suakin and his son Adlan II made sultan in his place.

Some of the sons of Abu Likayik rebelled against Badi walad Rajab in alliance with Adlan II, and killed him. One of the sons, Rajab, then assumed the regency himself. During his regency the Hamaj faced their greatest crisis when the Funj nearly succeeded in overthrowing them. While Rajab was on campaign in Kordofan in 1784/1785, the sultan Adlan II carried out a coup against Rajab's brother who was ruling as his deputy in Sennar. Returning from the west, Rajab was killed in the Battle of Taras with Funj forces in November 1785, and the Hamaj forces retreated in disarray. Adlan's restoration was short-lived however. In 1788/1799 the Hamaj defeated him again, restored their regency, and he died soon after. Rajab's campaign in 1785 marked the end of attempts by the Hamaj to control Kordofan, which was conquered in 1787 by the Keira Sultanate of Darfur, which thereafter exercised effective control over all of the territory west of the White Nile. The beginning of the loss of territory to the Funj state which culminated, in 1821, with the sultans and regents controlling little outside the city of Sennar itself.

Internecine warfare continued as the new regent Nasir found his position challenged by two of his brothers, Idris and Adlan. After several months of fighting he was killed in 1798, in an act of revenge, by the son of regent Badi walad Rajab, to avenge his father. Both Idris and Adlan became co-regents. Idris was distinguished by his reputation for justice and kindness and after his death Adlan ruled on his own. His nephew Muhammad, then apparently also as co-regent, conspired against him, overthrew him and held power until 1808, when he was killed by Muhammad, son of the regent Adlan, in revenge for his father's murder. Muhammad wad Adlan managed to retain power until 1821, on the eve of the Egyptian invasion, when he was overthrown by his cousin Hasan wad Rajab.

=== List of Funj Regents ===
- 1762 – 1775/1776 - Muhammad Abu Likayik
- 1775/1776 – 1780 - Badi wad Rajab
- 1780 – 1786/1787 - Rajab wad Muhammad
- 1786/1787 – 1798 - Nasir wad Muhammad
- 1798 – 1804 - Idris wad Abu Likayik or Muhammad
- 1798 – 1804 - Adlan wad Abu Likayik or Muhammad
- 1798 – 1808 - Muhammad wad Rajab
- 1804 – 1821 - Muhammad wad Adlan

== Final years ==
As the Egyptian army advanced south through Sudan in 1821, taking the submission of various tribes and towns as it went, the Hamaj regent Muhammad wad Adlan had sent a defiant message to its commander Ismail Pasha but early in April he was overthrown and killed by his cousin Hasan wad Rajab. By the time Hasan had suppressed all opposition, it was too late to mount any kind of opposition to the Egyptians. Hasan fled to the Ethiopian border, leaving the murdered regent's brother Ali wad Adlan to lead negotiations for capitulation. Probably on 12 June, the last Funj sultan Badi VII offered his submission to Ismail in person, and the following day the Egyptian army entered Sennar unopposed. The descriptions of the town they found are a sad testament to the ruin to which the endless wars and strife of the Hamaj had reduced Sennar - the royal palace was derelict, and the mosque covered in graffiti.

Shortly after taking Sennar Ismail Pasha suspected Ali wad Adlan of disloyalty, and had him hanged. Ismail also hunted down Hasan wad Rajab and the killers of the regent Muhammad wad Adlan. Hasan was imprisoned but treated with leniency - many of his confederates however were executed va impalement. Ismail released Hasan wad Rajab from prison and Hasan accompanied him on an expedition to Fazughli, near the Ethiopian border, raiding for slaves with a force of Hamaj cavalry alongside the Egyptians. In 1822, Ismail Pasha was killed by the Jaaliyyin at Shendi. Rebellions broke out all over central Sudan, but were steadily suppressed by the Egyptian garrisons along the Nile. Hasan wad Rajab led one rebellion but was killed fighting them at the Battle of Abu Shawka, south of Sennar.

Idris Muhammad Adlan Abu Likaylik was a Hamaj chieftain who was lord of the Funj mountains near the Ethiopian border. He didn't submit to Egyptian rule until 1826, when Ali Khurshid Bey, Egyptian governor of Sennar, brought about his reconciliation with the new regime. He was then appointed shaykh of the Funj mountains, where he remained in office until 1851 when the Governor-General Abdul Latif Pasha removed him and replaced him with his nephew Adlan. Thereafter, as the Egyptians steadily modernised local government, Hamaj clan members played little influence in Sudanese public life.
