= Nasir of Sennar =

Ruler of Sennar Sultanate (r. 1762–1769)

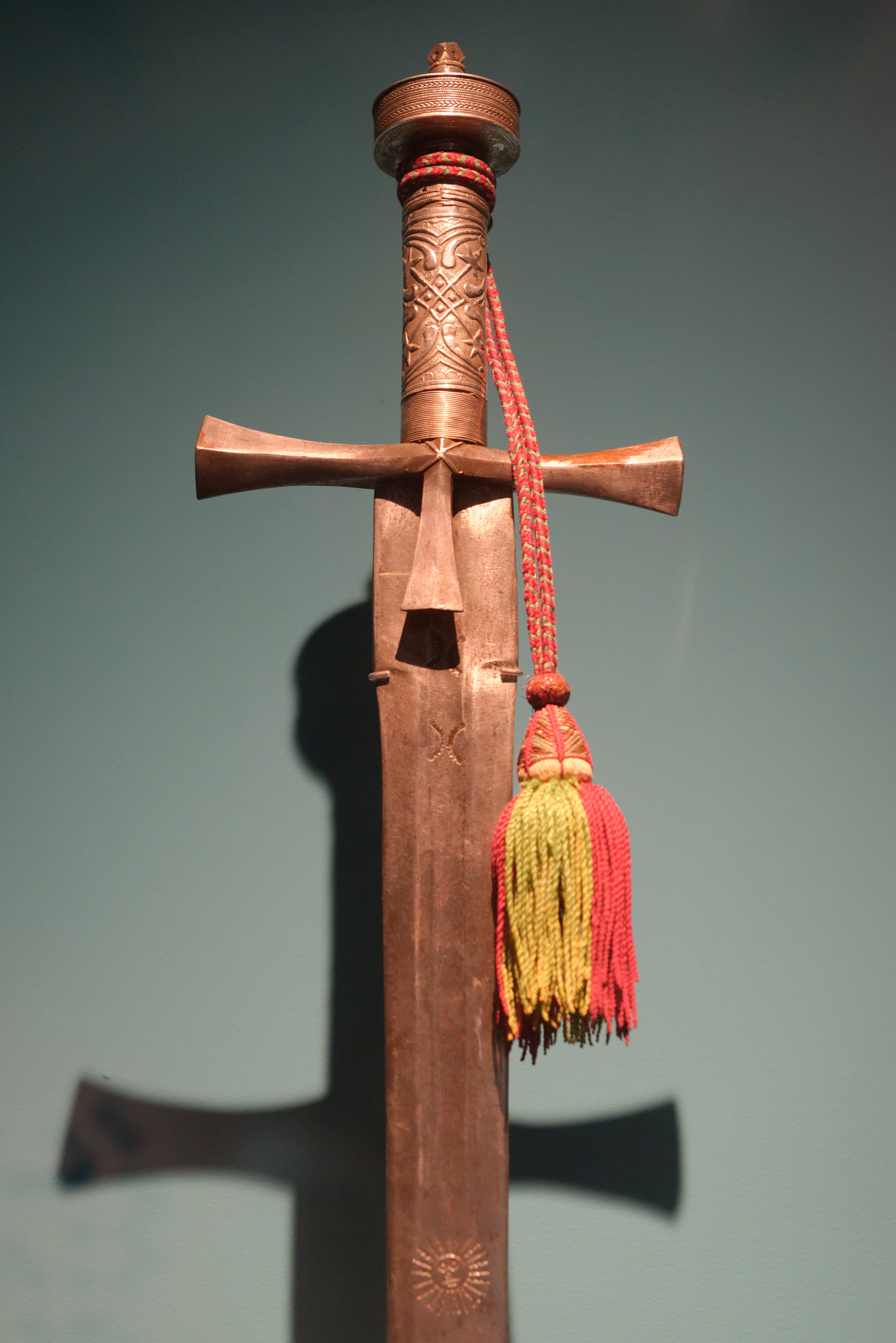
Sword of Nasir ibn Badi IV, National Corporation for Antiquities and Museums of Sudan

Nasir (r. 1762–1769) was a Hamaj regent under the Funj Sultanate of Sennar. He was the son of Badi IV, the previous ruler.

He deposed his father Badi, with the help of the vizier Sheikh Adelan and his brother Abu Kalec the governor of Kordofan. Badi fled to sanctuary in Ethiopia, where Emperor Iyoas I appointed the deposed king governor of the province of Ras al-Fil, near the border with Sennar. However envoys from Sennar convinced Badi to return to Sennar where he was quietly murdered after an imprisonment of two years.

Nasir was ritually executed in 1769 and succeeded by his brother Isma'il

== Notes ==
Preceded by Badi IV	King of Sennar	Succeeded by Isma'il
