= Battle of Madana =

1887 battle between the Ethiopian Empire and Mahdist Sudan

- Part of the Mahdist War, Agar Maqnat
Date	June 1888
Location	Madana, Sudan
Result	Ethiopian victory: Ethiopians sacked and captured Gallabat until 1889

Belligerents
Mahdist State	Ethiopian Empire

Commanders and leaders
Mohammed Wad Arbab †	Tekle Haymanot of Gojjam

Strength
16,000	30,000

The Battle of Madana was a military confrontation that took place in June 1887 between the army of the Ethiopian Empire led by Tekle Haymanot of Gojjam and the Mahdist army led by Mohammad Wad Arbab. The Ethiopians were victorious and Wad Arbab was killed on the battlefield. The Ethiopians then followed up on their victory by capturing and sacking the town of Gallabat.

== Background ==
After the Hewett Treaty, relations between the Ethiopian Empire and Mahdist Sudan had deteriorated. With the Mahdist side now viewing the Empire as a hostile force to be fought. With that situation at hand, the Mahdist Emir Mohammad Wad Arbab raided Ethiopian territory and destroyed some churches; an act which angered Tekle Haymanot of Gojjam, a powerful nobleman of the Empire. Tekle Haymanot requested the Mahdist hand over the raider. When they vehemently refused this, he invaded the Mahdist State at the head of an army 30,000 strong.

== Aftermath ==
The result of the Battle left the Mahdist State border open and vulnerable. The Ethiopians followed up their victory with a devastating raid on Mahdist territory including the city of Gallabat which they sacked, slaughtering the population and enslaving the women and children. Among the massacred were wounded Mahdist troops who had retreated from the battle.
