= Tekle Haymanot of Gojjam =

Ethiopian noble and army commander (1847–1901)

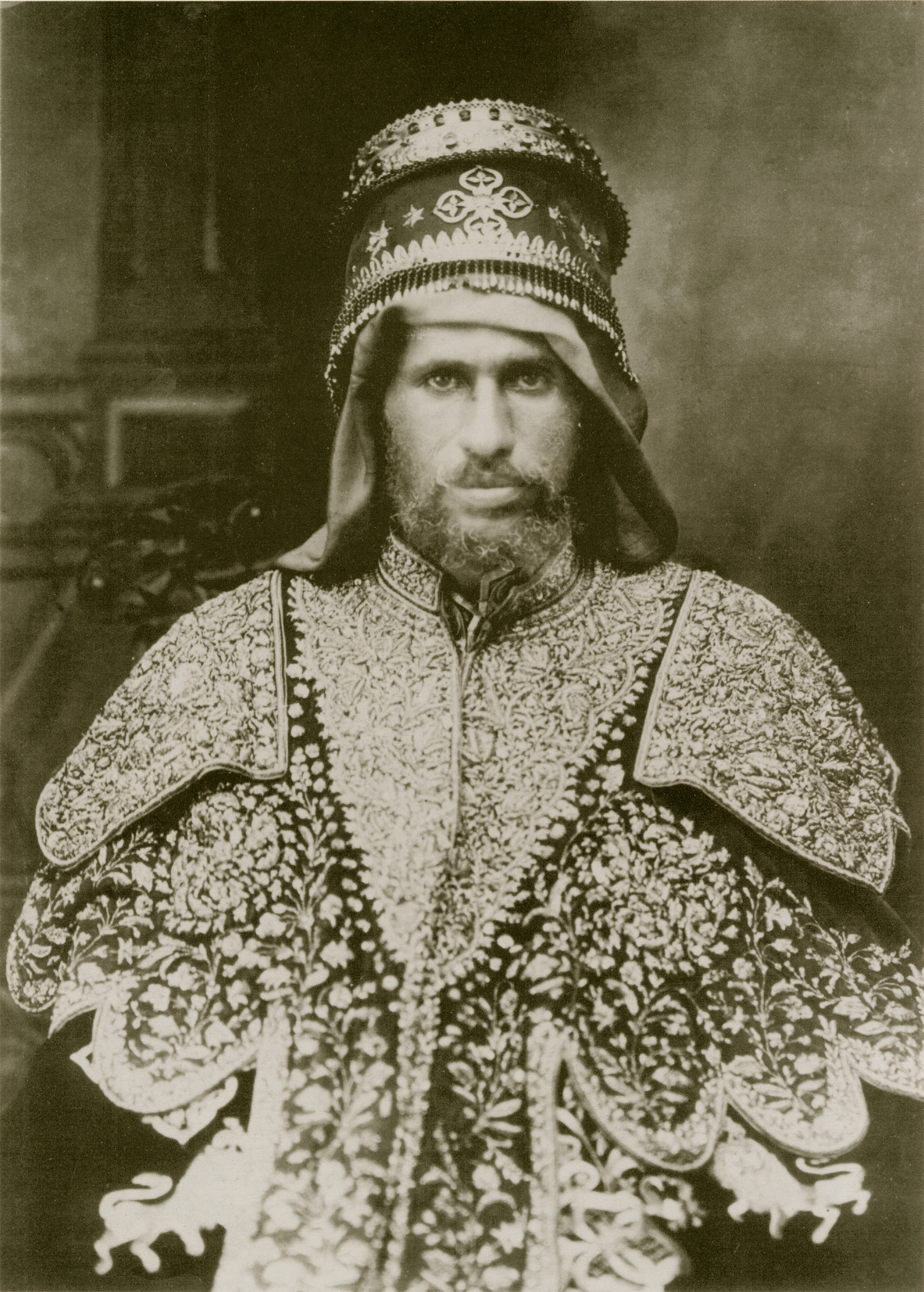
- Picture of Tekle Haymanot, between 1882 and 1901

King of Gojjam
- Reign: 20 January 1881 – 10 January 1901
- Predecessor: Tesema Goshu
- Born: c. 1847; Jabi Tehnan, Ethiopian Empire,
- Died: 10 January 1901 (aged 53–54)
- Spouse: Laqetch Gebre Mehdin
- Father: Tesema Goshu, King of Gojjam

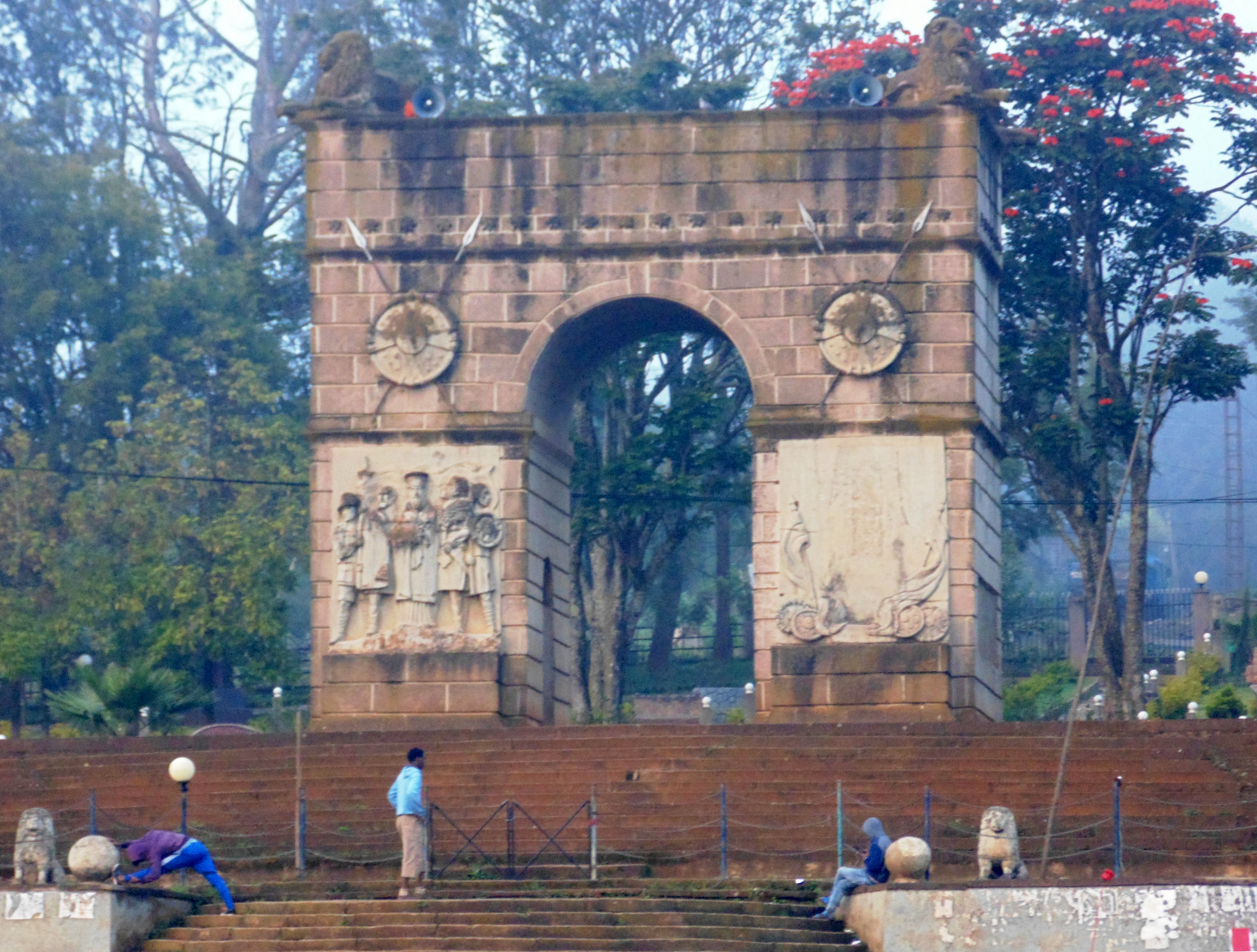
The Tekle Haymanot Arch in Debre Markos

Tekle Haymanot Tesema, also known as Adal Tesema, Tekle Haymanot of Gojjam, and Tekle Haimanot of Gojjam (c. 1847 – 10 January 1901), was King (Negus) of Gojjam. He was later an army commander and a member of the nobility of the Ethiopian Empire.

== Biography ==
Tekle Haymanot Tesema, born Adal Tesema, was the son of Tesema Goshu, the Negus (Note: Roughly equivalent to King.) of Gojjam—a province of the Ethiopian Empire—and the grandson of Ras Goshu Zewde. The title "King of Gojjam" was an honorific title.

=== Under Tekle Giyorgis ===
Dejazmach (Note: "Commander of the Gate", roughly equivalent to Count.) Tesema Goshu died during his son's minority. As a result, a rival, and Gojam prince, of the Gojam imperial house, named Ras Desta Tadla assumed control in Gojjam and imprisoned Adal. Adal eventually escaped to the lowlands and raised an army. After returning to Gojjam and defeating Ras Desta, Adal submitted to Nəgusä Nägäst (Note: "King of Kings", usually translated as Emperor.) Tekle Giyorgis who confirmed him as the Shum (Note: Equivalent to Governor.) of Gojjam and as Dejazmach. The Nəgusä Nägäst even allowed Adal to marry his paternal sister, Laqetch Gebre Mehdin.

=== Under Yohannes IV ===
On 11 July 1871, Dejazmach Kassay Mercha defeated Nəgusä Nägäst Tekle Giyorgis and reinstated Ras Desta in Gojjam. On 21 January 1872, Kassay Mercha became Nəgusä Nägäst Yohannes IV and left Gojjam. Adal then returned to Gojjam and killed Desta. At that point, Adal had consolidated all of Gojjam under his rule. In 1874, Adal submitted to Nəgusä Nägäst Yohannes IV. Adal was now Ras (Note: Roughly equivalent to Duke.) Tekle Haymanot Tesema.

On 20 January 1881, in Debre Tabor, Nəgusä Nägäst Yohannes IV appointed Ras Tekle Haymanot Tesema as Negus of Gojjam Province and as Negus of Kaffa Province. However, the latter province was only his if he was able to conquer it. Unfortunately for Ras Tekle Haymanot Tesema, Ras Menelik, Negus of Shewa, was also interested in Kaffa Province. Yohannes provided Tekle Haymanot with 8,000 rifles to help with the conquest.

==== The Battle of Embabo ====
The followers of Negus Tekle Haymanot Tesema attempted to extend his control over the Kingdom of Kaffa. But, on 6 June 1882, his forces were defeated at the Battle of Embabo by the superior forces of Negus Menelik. Tekle Haymanot Tesema was captured and Menelik gained the upper hand in Kaffa. But Yohannes intervened and, while allowing Menelik to have Kaffa, he made Menelik give Wollo Province to Ras Araya Selassie Yohannes, his legitimate son.

==== Destruction and submission ====
In January 1887 Negus Tekle Haymanot defeated the Mahdists at the Battle of Madana between Gederaf and Gallabat. The In revenge, the following year the Mahdists under the command of Abu Anga campaigned into Ethiopia with an Army the size of 81,000 men. Their objective was the Historical town of Gondar. Tekle Haymanot confronted him at Sar Weha (in Dembiya) on 18 January 1888, but was defeated.

Austrian Catholic missionary Joseph Ohrwalder, who witnessed the battle, said that Tekle Haymanot's forces fought with "the courage of Lions" to protect their country and religion from the Muslim invaders, but they were overwhelmed by the larger and better equipped Mahdist army.

As a result of this loss, northwestern Ethiopia was open to the Mahdists who followed up their victory by entering, sacking, and burning Gondar.

Joseph Ohrwalder testified to the brutality that took place during the sack of Gondar:

[…] The road to Gondar, the former capital of Abyssinia, was now clear, and Abu Anga advanced towards it, hoping that he would secure great quantities of treasure. It was a march of only thirty miles from the battlefield, and was soon reached; sacked, plundered, and reduced to ashes; the churches were pillaged and then burnt; priests were thrown down from the roof and killed; the population massacred, and women and children dragged in hundreds into slavery.

Emperor Yohannes IV ordered Negus Menelik and his Shewan army into Gojjam and Begemder. Sensing a shift in power, Negus Tekle Haymanot Tesema negotiated a defensive alliance with Menelik. After Menelik secured Gojjam and Begemder, Yohannes ordered him to return to Shewa.

In July of that year, the Mahdist army under Abu Anga advanced into Ethiopian territory once again, where Tekle Haymanot's army dealt them a crushing defeat. British historian Lord Edward Gleichen states Tekle Haymanot "smote [Abu Anga] hip and thigh". Abu Anga died shortly after this defeat.

In September 1888, when Tekle Haymanot Tesema refused to contribute forces to the efforts of Yohannes against Mahdist who had re-entered western Gojjam, Yohannes suspected Tekle Haymanot and Menelik of plotting against him. To destroy the power of Tekle Haymanot, the army of Yohannes laid waste to much of Gojjam. As a result of the destruction, Tekle Haymanot submitted to Yohannes.

=== Under Menelik II ===
In 1889, soon after the death of Yohannes at the Battle of Gallabat, Menelik proclaimed himself Nəgusä Nägäst Menelik II. Negus Tekle Haymanot pledged his allegiance to the new Nəgusä Nägäst. Menelik reinstated Tekle Haymanot as Shum of Gojjam and named him as an advisor.

==== Battle of Adwa ====
In 1896, Negus Tekle Haymanot fought at the Battle of Adwa on the side of Menelik. During the battle of Adwa he commanded 8,000 riflemen, 15,000 spearmen and 700 cavalry.

==== Death ====
Ultimately Emperor Menelik determined that Gojjam was too valuable a province to be held by one man and, upon the death of Tekle Haymanot, Menelik divided Gojjam into three parts. He assigned the three parts to different men responsible to him. One of the men came from Shewa.

Tekle Haymanot Tesema was the father of at least three sons and four daughters. His sons were as follows: Bezabah, Hailu, and Balaw. One of his sons, Ras Hailu Tekle Haymanot, succeeded him as Hailu II of Gojjam.

== See also ==
- Ethiopian aristocratic and court titles
- List of field marshals

== Notes ==
Footnotes

Citations
