= Battle of Wad Kaltabu =

1837 Ethiopian-Ottoman conflict

- Part of Ottoman–Ethiopian border conflicts
Date	22 April 1837 (189 years and 4 months)
Location	Wad Kaltabu, Ottoman Empire (near Rashid, Al Qadarif, now Sudan)
Result	Ethiopian victory

Belligerents
Ethiopian Empire: Dembiya	Eyalet of Egypt

Commanders and leaders
(Ethiopian Empire) Kenfu Hailu (Ethiopian Empire) Kassa Hailu	(Ottoman Empire) Ahmad Khashif (Ottoman Empire) Salim Efendi (surrendered) (Ottoman Empire) Ali Agha al-Sahbi (surrendered) Unknown officer(s) of the regulars (MIA) Sheikh Miri †

Strength
20,000	1,500

Casualties and losses
Unknown	Heavy

The Battle of Wad Kaltabu, also known as the Battle of Kalnabu, was a military engagement fought on 22 April 1837 between the forces of Kenfu Haile Giorgis, a nobleman of Dembiya, and an Ottoman-Egyptian force led by Ahmad Kashif. Due to the similarities between the Battle of Gallabat (1837) (the first battle at Gallabat), and Wadkaltabu which would occur a month later, the two events are often conflated and details mixed up.

== Background ==
According to the British consul-general in Egypt: Rajab wad Bashir al-Ghul, a Sheikh the Rufaa people fled to Abyssinia after the Turks made Abu Rish, his brother, the sheikh. When he returned, four months later, with an army under Kenfu, he seized Abu Rish's women, slaves, and flocks, withdrawing back across the border. Khurshid, the Pasha at Er Roseires, heard of this from Ahmad Kashif and bribed one of Kenfu's men to betray Rajab, who was taken five months later and brought to Khartoum in the spring of 1836 to be impaled.

The district the battle occurred in is distinct from others in Al Qadarif, having been an 18th century colony of Takruri from Darfur and West Africa who obtained permission from the Emperor Ethiopia to make a permanent settlement there during the period of Ethiopian province Ras al-Fil. One notable ruler of the Tukrir was Sheikh Miri, who has been described as "probably the most celebrated of these border chiefs." The Sheikh formed an alliance with the Khedive some time after Muhammad Ali of Egypt had conquered the Sennar sultanate in 1821, and proclaimed himself independent of the Ethiopian Empire. He accompanied the Turks (Egyptians) in their raid on Gondar, but according to some sources, escaped the ambush of Dejazmatch Kenfu; having been killed either at Kalnabu or a year later by future emperor Kassa Hailu's attack on Battle of Gallabat (1838) a year later. According to other sources, he was slain at Kalnabu.

The conflict itself began when an Egyptian governor was sent to Gallabat to collect tribute from the area, "which submitted in 1832 and again in 1834, but which was still claimed by the Ethiopians." After advancing beyond Metemma, the Egyptians decided to retreat after hearing of a large Ethiopian force sent to collect tribute from Gallabat.

== Prelude ==
Ahmad Kashif wanted to make a punitive expedition against the Abyssinians. With a few troops he went forward and destroyed two villages, being met with resistance but taking a number of captives, among whom was a priest. Kinfu, in secrecy, raised an army to take revenge.

== Battle ==
Incorrect intel reached the governor of the Sudan, who thought that Kenfu's force was small. Khurshid Pasha sent 600 men with the commandant of the 5th battalion, 400 Magharba cavalry and 200 Sha'iqiya horsemen. Counting the troops already in Al-Atish the total force amounted to 1,500 men, all under the command of Ahmad Kashif. As Ahmad crossed over into Abyssinian territory Kenfu advanced with an army of 20,000 men, who surrounded Ahmad's force. Ahmad appealed to Salim Efendi, the commandant of the 5th battalion, for his professional advice, but Salim was angry about being subordinate to Ahmad and refused to help, answering that, as Ahmad was in command, he should give the necessary orders and he would carry them out. Ahmad Kashif was not cowardly but ignorant of military science and didn't know what to do. He asked Salim to take over, but Salim refused. Meanwhile, the Abyssinians were coming forward; there was no time to lose. Ahmad charged with the cavalry and Salim Efendi made a series of disorganized attacks on the enemy. After an hour of skirmishing the cavalry were taken prisoner, the regular troops fell back, and Ahmad Kashif escaped with a few horsemen. Kenfu took three important prisoners: Salim Efendi, Ali Agha al-Sahbi (chief of the Magharba Arabs,) ransomed later by his mother, and the chief of the Shaigiya tribe, who was also ransomed by his relatives.

Not much detail is given on the battle itself; The sheikh of the Tekruris accompanied a larger Egyptian force entered Metemma in the May of 1837. This force, likely reinforced by part of the population of Metemma, started to advance in the direction of Gondar, pillaging and burning through the area it crossed.

Believing that the intention of the Egyptians was to sack the town, Gondar was thrown into panic, while the governor of Dembiya, Dejazmatch Kinfu, quickly gathered an army and moved north to attack the invaders who had already returned to the area around Gallabat. The Egyptian force retreated in the direction of their military post at Doka further in modern-day Sudan, but were forced to battle at a place named "Kalnabu" near the town of Rashid, in an open area very unsuitable for defending against the Ethiopian cavalry (which Qwarans were known for). Most of the regular infantry, the officers of both forces, and Sheikh Miri were captured or killed, although part of the irregular cavalry escaped.

== Aftermath ==
Kinfu then returned, contented, to Gondar while Ahmad Kashif blamed the loss on Salim Efendi and said he thought Kinfu would be likely to return. Whether he was thoroughly frightened or wished to cover up Ahmad Kashif's shortcomings, Khurshid wrote to Cairo that there was a risk that the Sudan might be lost to Abyssinia. He reported the defeat of the force and his own deficiency in military strength and added that if he were sent a regiment of infantry or cavalry he would attack and defeat Kinfu in Gondar.

This gave Muhammad Ali of Egypt some hope of conquering Abyssinia, which caused the preparation of an adequate force to be dispatched under Ahmad Pasha abu Adhan. Khurshid Pasha called 1,200, the normal size of a battalion, to Wad Medani, and another battalion was brought from Dongola. He had a total of 7,500 men, excluding reinforcements from Cairo. However, the Ottoman forces would not advance past Fazogli due to statements by English Consuls in Alexandria that William IV would not approve of an attack on Christian Ethiopia. The defeat nearly lead to an invasion of Ethiopia, which would not occur until the Ethiopian–Egyptian War decades later, when Egypt's disastrous invasion put an end to all ambitions of conquering Abyssinia and its costs added to the nation's massive financial debts and the decline of the later khedivate.
