= 65th Infantry Division "Granatieri di Savoia" =

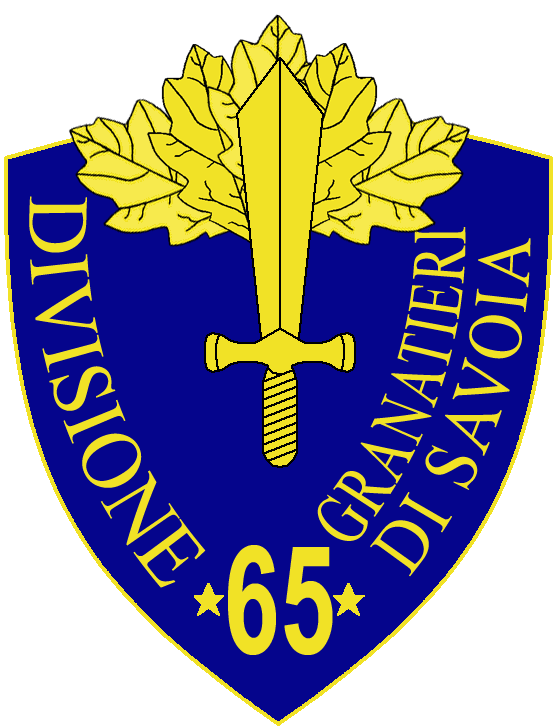
- 65th Infantry Division "Granatieri di Savoia" insignia
- Active: 12 October 1936 – 20 April 1941
- Country: Kingdom of Italy
- Branch: Royal Italian Army
- Size: Division
- Garrison/HQ: Addis Ababa, Ethiopia
- Engagements: World War II

Commanders
- Notable commanders: General Amedeo Liberati

Insignia
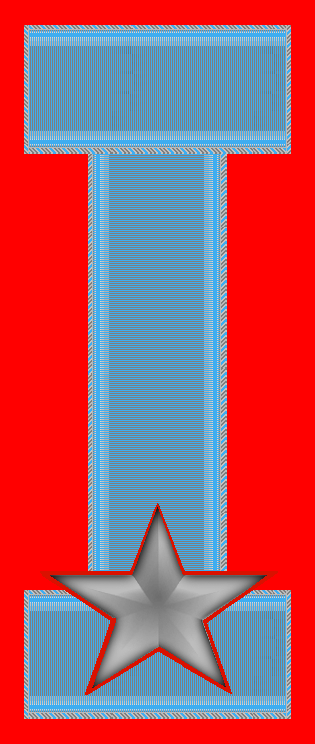
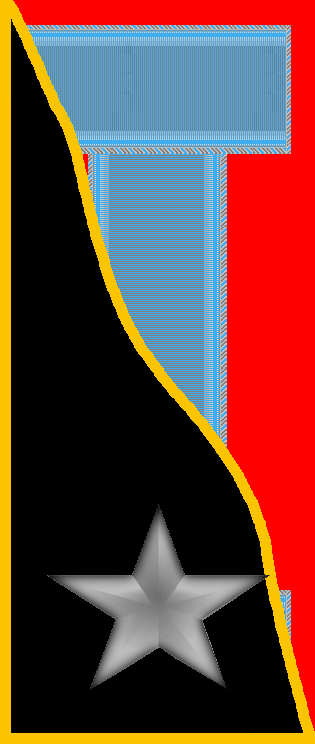
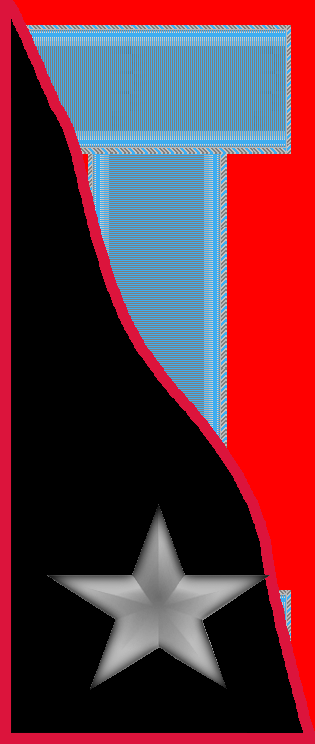
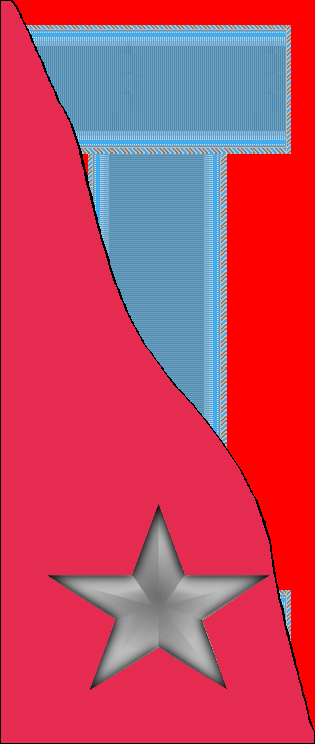
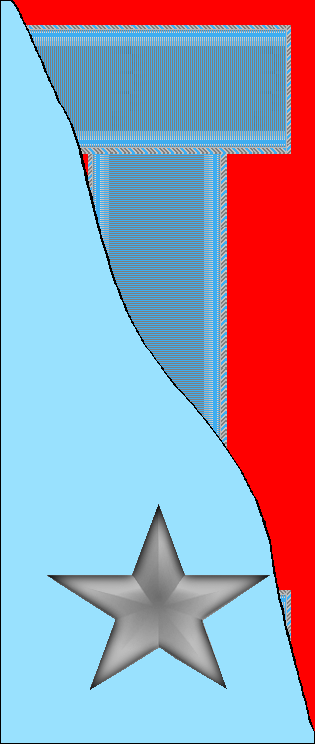
- Identification symbol: Granatieri di Savoia gorget patches

The 65th Infantry Division "Granatieri di Savoia" (Italian: 65ª Divisione fanteria "Granatieri di Savoia") was an infantry division of the Royal Italian Army during World War II. The Granatieri di Savoia was formed on 12 October 1936 in Littoria and disbanded on 20 April 1941 in Soddu, Ethiopia. The division's name translates as "Grenadiers of Savoy", with the House of Savoy being the ruling family of the Kingdom of Italy.

== History ==
The 65th Infantry Division "Granatieri di Savoia" was activated on 12 October 1936 in Littoria with the I Grenadier Brigade, the 60th Artillery Regiment with two groups equipped with 65/17 mod. 13 mountain guns, the LXV Machine Gun Battalion, and various divisional services. The I Grenadier Brigade consisted of the 10th Regiment "Granatieri di Savoia", which had been formed by the regimental depot of the 1st Regiment "Granatieri di Sardegna", and the 11th Regiment "Granatieri di Savoia", which had been formed by the regimental depot of the 2nd Regiment "Granatieri di Sardegna". Both regiments consisted of three battalions.

=== Ethiopia garrison duty ===
On 26 October 1936, the division was transferred from Littoria to Addis Ababa, the capital of the recently conquered Italian East Africa. The Granatieri di Savoia were used for mopping-up Ethiopian military remnants at Shewa Kifle Hāger and Addis Ababa. The division also guarded the Djibouti-Addis Ababa railroad. In February 1938, the I Grenadier Brigade was dissolved and the two grenadier regiments were placed under direct divisional control. In August 1938 the division exchanged the third grenadier battalions in its two regiments for an Alpini respectively on Bersaglieri battalion. In the next years some of the division's units were detached for the police duties at Blue Nile, Debre Sīna, Sendafa and Ādīs ‘Alem.

=== Second Sino-Japanese War ===
During the Second Sino-Japanese War Italy dispatched the I Grenadier Battalion of the 10th Regiment to China on 23 August 1937 to help guard the Shanghai International Settlement during the Battle of Shanghai. The battalion returned to Addis Ababa on 28 December 1938.

=== World War II ===
After the start of World War II the division was reinforced by the 11th East African CC.NN. Legion comprising two battalions of Blackshirt volunteers, which was soon detached with the LXV Machine Gun Battalion and the artillery regiment's V Group with 105/28 cannons to the border with British Somaliland. Another CC.NN. battalion and a training battalion were posted to the border with Sudan, while the 11th Regiment's Bersaglieri Battalion was posted to Jimma to cover the colonies western border.

=== Italian conquest of British Somaliland ===
The division with all its units participated in the Italian conquest of British Somaliland. The division started the invasion at Dire Dawa on 3 August 1940 and reached Zeila on the coast on 6 August 1940, without encountering any resistance. The units then proceeded in two columns to Berbera, one along the Buuloxareed coast, and another through Hargeisa. The progress of the column on the Buuloxareed route was significantly hindered by incessant coastal bombardment from British ships, but the inland column reached the frontline on 15 August 1940, contributing to the capture of the fortifications near Cadaadley (Tug Argan). By that time the British had already decided to abandon the colony. After 3-days of fighting with British rearguards, the soldiers of Granatieri di Savoia entered an already abandoned Berbera on 19 August 1940.

=== Skirmishes on the Sudan border ===
The training battalion (comprising two machine gun companies, an infantry company, and a mortar company with 81 mm mortars) was located north-west of Lake Tana, and the II CC.NN. Battalion of the 11th CC.NN. Legion was at Gondar. In the aftermath of the less-than-successful Capture of Kassala, the elements of 10th Indian Infantry Brigade captured the border fort at Qallābāt near Metemma, but retreated after facing superior Italian ground and air forces.

=== Defence of Ethiopia (1941) ===
After Emperor Selassie returned to Ethiopia on 18 January 1941, the last units of the Granatieri di Savoia left Addis Ababa to cover as many threats from insurgents and foreign powers as possible. The divisional command and LXV Machine Gun Battalion took positions along the Awash River. A machine gun company, the II and III groups with 65/17 mod. 13 mountain guns took positions at Amba Alagi. The bulk of the forces (10th and 11th Grenadier regiments, the 11th CC.NN. Legion, I Group with 65/17 mod. 13 mountain guns, and IV Group with 100/17 mod. 14 howitzers were stationed on the border with Eritrea. The V Group with 105/28 cannons was stationed in Dire Dawa.

The division's main force got hit first. As the Battle of Keren started on 5 February 1941, the Granatieri di Savoia mostly held their positions and counter-attacked, resulting in the failure of the British attack by 13 February 1941. Subsequently, the British forces paused for a month to gather more troops and supplies. A renewed British attack from 15 March 1941 had not made any initial penetrations, but on 27 March 1941 British armor penetrated Italian defences and was advancing on the Keren plain, forcing the Italians to fall back. The retreat failed, and the British forced the Italian garrisons at Adi Tekelezan to surrender on 1 April 1941. Consequently, Massawa fell on 8 April 1941.

The V Group in Dire Dawa was also engaged in heavy fighting from 17 March 1941 to 27 March 1941, and the last remnants of the group were overrun near Harar. British Forces reached the defense line along the Awash River by the end of March 1941. After several delaying battles by Italian machine gunners, the defence line was penetrated to such an extent that on 3 April 1941 the commander of the Granatieri di Savoia ordered a retreat to Galla-Sidamo Governorate to prevent a complete encirclement. Italian forces were concentrating first at Shashamane and then at Sodo. On 20 April the survivors of the divisional command and LXV Machine Gun Battalion were merged with the remnants of the 25th Colonial Division.

The last units of the Granatieri di Savoia entrenched at Togora Pass, Kalaga, and Cerarsi around Amba Alagi and participated in the Battle of Amba Alagi from 21 April 1941 to 17 May 1941. The last men of the Granatieri di Savoia Division surrendered on 19 May 1941 after their supply of drinking water was exhausted.

== Organization ==
=== 1936 ===
- 10th Regiment "Granatieri di Savoia"
  - 3 × Grenadier battalions
- 11th Regiment "Granatieri di Savoia"
  - 3 × Grenadier battalions
- 60th Artillery Regiment "Granatieri di Savoia"
  - I Group (12 × 65/17 mod. 13 mountain guns)
  - II Group (12 × 65/17 mod. 13 mountain guns)
- LXV Machine Gun Battalion (36 × machine guns in 4 × companies)

=== World War II ===
65th Infantry Division "Granatieri di Savoia" organization

- 65th Infantry Division "Granatieri di Savoia", in Addis Ababa
  - Headquarters
    - Command Company
    - Carabinieri Section
    - Field Post Office
    - 65th Infantry Division Command Transport Squad
  - 10th Regiment "Granatieri di Savoia"
    - Command Company
    - 2 × Grenadier battalions
    - Alpini Battalion "Uork Amba"
    - Support Weapons Battery (65/17 mod. 13 infantry support guns)
    - Mortar Company (81mm mod. 35 mortars)
  - 11th Regiment "Granatieri di Savoia"
    - Command Company
    - 2 × Grenadier battalions
    - African Bersaglieri Battalion
    - Support Weapons Battery (65/17 mod. 13 infantry support guns)
    - Mortar Company (81mm mod. 35 mortars)
  - 60th Artillery Regiment "Granatieri di Savoia"
    - Command Unit
    - I Group (65/17 mod. 13 mountain guns)
    - II Group (65/17 mod. 13 mountain guns)
    - III Group (65/17 mod. 13 mountain guns)
    - IV Group (100/17 mod. 14 howitzers)
    - V Group (105/28 cannons)
    - Ammunition and Supply Unit
  - Cavalry Squadrons Group "Cavalieri di Neghelli" ("Knights of Neghelli")
    - 2 × Cavalry squadrons
    - 1 × Tank Squadron (L3/33 tankettes)
  - LXV Machine Gun Battalion
  - 60th Engineer Company
  - 60th Telegraph and Radio Operators Company
  - Medical Section
  - Supply Section
  - Transport Section

Attached to the division:

- 11th African CC.NN. Legion
  - I African CC.NN. Battalion
  - XII African CC.NN. Battalion
  - 11th African CC.NN. Machine Gun Company

== Commanding officers ==
The division's commanding officers were:

- Generale di Divisione Luigi Perego
- Generale di Divisione Enrico Armando
- Generale di Divisione Ettore Scala
- Generale di Divisione Antonio Calierno
- Generale di Divisione Amedeo Liberati (1940 - 19 May 1941, POW)
