= Funj Chronicle =

The Funj Chronicle is an Arabic history of the Funj Sultanate and the early years of Ottoman rule in the Sudan based on oral tradition. It originally covered the period from 1504 to 1838, but continuations bring it up to 1871. It has been translated into English.

== Manuscripts and editions ==
The Chronicle exists in several recensions. The original was written by Shaykh Aḥmad, called Kātib al-Shūna, and covered Funj history from 1504 to 1838 (AH 910–1254). He began his work before the Ottoman conquest of the Funj in 1820. There were two versions of the original in circulation, an early draft and a polished version with some fifteen passages removed. The first continuator was Shaykh Aḥmad al-Ḥājj Muḥammad Janqāl. Besides continuing the chronicle, he interpolated a couple of passages of his own into the original. The polished original recension is known from two manuscripts. Two further fragmentary manuscripts, in part, preserve the earlier draft and the first continuation.

A second continuation of the Chronicle was made by al-Zubayr wad Ḍawwah, who extended it up to 1863 (1280), while also adding to the beginning material on medieval Nubia drawn from Ibn Sulaym al-Aswānī via al-Maqrīzī. The final recension was made by Ibrāhīm ʿAbd al-Dāfiʿ. He cut much of al-Zubayr's additions to the beginning and added some material on al-Zubayr's father as well as a final notice from al-Amīn Muḥammad al-Ḍarīr that extends the Chronicle up to 1871 (1288). There is one manuscript of al-Zubayr's version. The final recension is known from many manuscripts.

Both the original and final recensions have been published, the former under the title Taʾrīkh mulūk al-Sūdān by Makkī Shubayka at Khartoum in 1947 and the latter as Makhṭūṭat Kātib al-Shūna at Cairo in 1963. Harold MacMichael produced a summary translation of the final recension in 1922. Peter Holt made a complete translation.

The final recension was edited by the Egyptian historian Al-Shater Bossely Abdul Jalil and published in Cairo as Makhṭūṭat Kātib al-Shūna fī Taʾrīkh al-Salṭana al-Sinnārīya wa-'l-Idāra al-Miṣrīya.

== Sources and structure ==
The Kātib al-Shūna admits in his introduction that his sources are mainly anecdotes, often contradictory ones. For the latter part of the Chronicle he makes use of family stories and finally his own memories. He did make use of two written sources: a king-list distinct from that acquired by James Bruce in 1772 and the Ṭabaqāt of Wad Ḍayfallāh, a biographical dictionary of Sudanese religious men compiled between 1753 and 1805.

The first part of the Chronicle is based on the king-list, fleshed out with occasional anecdotes. O'Fahey and Spaulding call it "a king-list with the accretion of a certain amount of commentary". The Chronicle goes into more depth beginning with the reign of Bādī IV (1724–1762). From 1788/1789 (AH 1203), the reign-based structure is dropped because "the power of the Funj ended, and no list of them was kept. Their kingship became a customary institution, and the regnal dating passed in reality in the name of the Hamaj". The Chronicle is thus at its most detailed for the period of the Hamaj Regency.

The Chronicle has a narrow geographical scope, centred on the Blue Nile and the Funj capital, Sinnār. The region west of the White Nile and the northern regions of the ʿAbdallāb and Jaʿaliyyūn are only occasionally mentioned. Likewise, the Kātib did not know anything of the Khashm al-Baḥr to the south of Sinnār before the Hamaj Regency. The Shāyqiyya are not mentioned before the Ottoman invasion. With the coming of the Ottomans, the scope of the Chronicle expands somewhat. The latter part is structured around the tenures of the Ottoman governor-generals.

In 1999 Holt published The Sudan of the Three Niles: The Funj Chronicle, 910–1288/1504–1871, the first complete English translation of the Funj Chronicle. He based the translation on the Cairo recension of Makhṭūṭat Kātib al-Shūna, edited by Al-Shater Bossely Abdul Jalil, supplemented by manuscripts held in Istanbul, Nottingham, Vienna and Paris.

== Works cited ==
- Holt, P. M., ed. (1999). The Sudan of the Three Niles: The Funj Chronicle, 910–1288/1504–1871. Brill.
- O'Fahey, R. S.; Spaulding, J. L. (1974). Kingdoms of the Sudan. Methuen.
- MacMichael, H. A. (1922). A History of the Arabs in the Sudan. Vol. 2. Frank Cass.
