= Battle of Gallabat =

1889 battle between the Ethiopian Empire and Mahdist Sudan

- Part of the Mahdist War
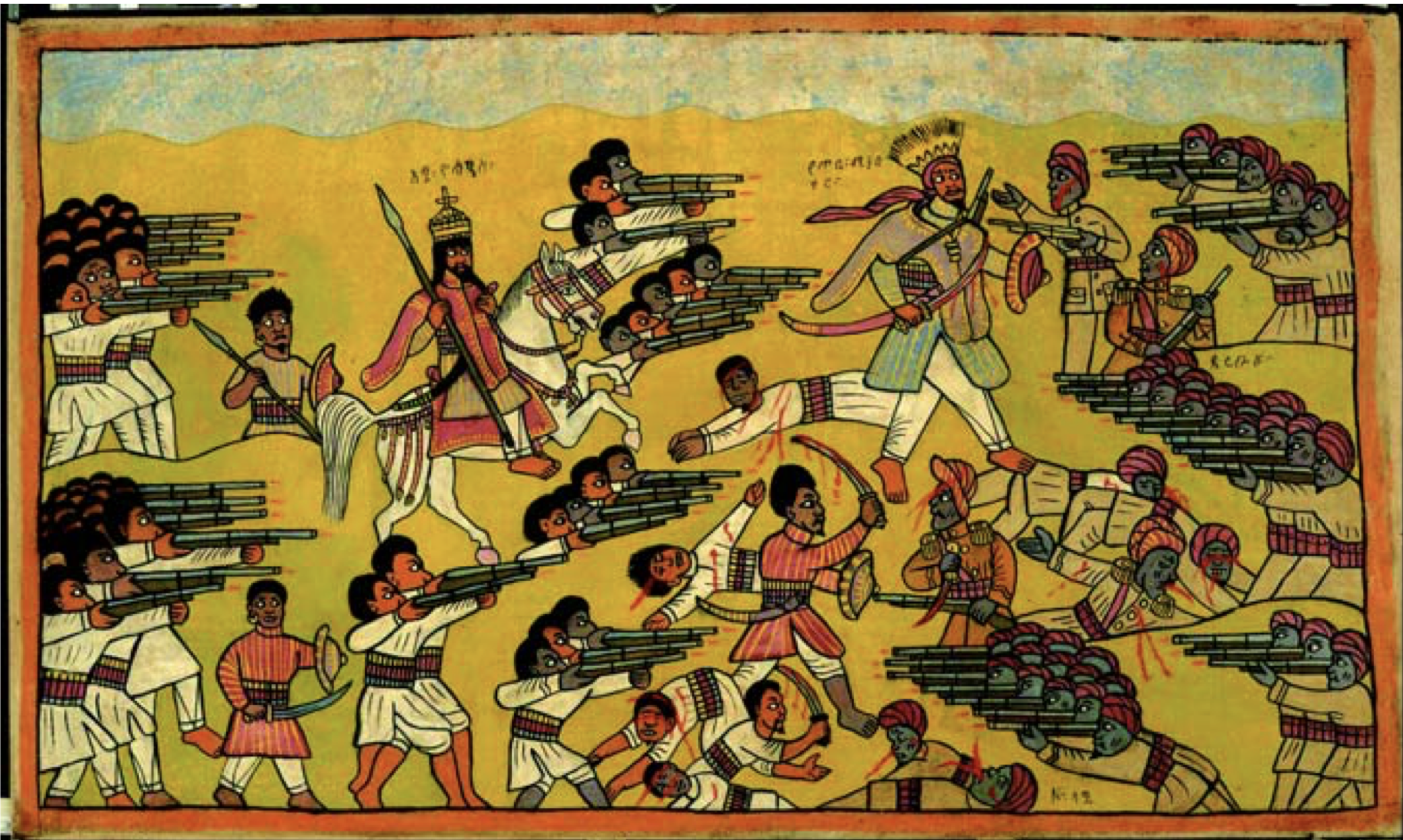
- Emperor Yohannes against the Mahdists
Date	9–10 March 1889
Location	Gallabat, Sudan
Result	Mahdist victory

Belligerents
Mahdist State	Ethiopian Empire

Commanders and leaders
Zeki Tummal	Yohannes IV of Ethiopia †; Ras Mengesha Yohannes; Ras Mikael of Wollo; Ras Alula

Strength
85,000 men	130,000 foot soldiers, 20,000 cavalry

Casualties and losses
<15,000 killed	<15,000 killed

The Battle of Gallabat, also known as the Battle of Metemma, was fought on 9–10 March 1889 during the Mahdist War between the Mahdist Sudanese and Ethiopian forces. It is a critical event in Ethiopian history because Nəgusä Nägäst (or Emperor) Yohannes IV was killed in this battle, and because it was the last major battle on the Ethiopian front of the Mahdist War. The fighting occurred at the site of the twin settlements of Gallabat (in modern-day Sudan) and Metemma (in modern-day Ethiopia).

== Background ==
When the Mahdists rebelled against the Egyptians, many Egyptian garrisons found themselves isolated in Sudan. As a result, the British, who had taken over the government of Egypt, negotiated the Treaty of Adowa with Emperor Yohannes IV of Ethiopia on 3 June 1884 whereby the Egyptian garrisons were allowed to evacuate to Massawa through Ethiopian territory. After that, the Mahdist Khalifa, Abdallahi ibn Muhammad, considered the Ethiopians to be his enemies and sent his forces to attack them. The twin communities of Gallabat and Metemma were located on the trade route from the Nile to Gondar, the old Imperial capital; the Mahdists used these communities as their base for attacks on Ethiopia.

In January 1887, Tekle Haymanot lost patience and attacked Gallabat with 30,000 men. The Sudanese garrison was put to flight, Muhammad wad Arba being killed in the fighting. The Ethiopians then plundered and sacked the region of Gedaref. The wounded were killed, the dead were mutilated and the women were carried off into captivity. As revenge, the next year, the Mahdists under the command of Abu Anga campaigned into Ethiopia with an Army 81,000 men strong. Their objective was the historical town of Gondar. Tekle Haymanot confronted them at Sar Weha (in Dembiya) on 18 January 1888, but was defeated. Joseph Ohrwalder, who witnessed the battle, stated that the forces of Tekle Haymanot fought with “the courage of lions” to protect their country and religion from the Muslim invaders, but were overwhelmed by the better disciplined Mahdist army. As a result of this loss, northwestern Ethiopia was open to the Mahdists who entered Gondar to plunder it. Many churches were burnt and pillaged, priests were thrown down from roofs and killed, many people were massacred and hundreds of women and children were enslaved.

Despite this damage to the historic capital, Emperor Yohannes held back from a counterattack due to his suspicions of Menelik II, then ruler of Shewa. He wanted to campaign against Menelik, but the clergy and his senior officers pressed him to handle the Mahdist threat first. The Abyssinians under Ras Gobana Dacche did defeat the Mahdists in the Battle of Guté Dili in the province of Welega on 14 October 1888. Following this victory, the Emperor accepted the advice of his people, and according to Alaqa Lamlam concluded "if I come back I can fight Shewa later on when I return. And if I die at Matamma in the hands of the heathens I shall go to heaven."

== Battle ==
In late January 1889, Yohannes mustered a huge army of 130,000 infantry and 20,000 cavalry in Dembiya. The Sudanese gathered an army of 85,000 and fortified themselves in Gallabat, surrounding the town with a huge zariba, a barrier made of entwined thorn bushes, replicating the effect of barbed wire. After Abu Anga had died of illness, the Khalifa appointed Zeki Tummal, one of Anga's lieutenants, to the command of the forces at Gallabat.

On 8 March 1889 the Ethiopian army arrived within sight of Gallabat, and the attack began in earnest the next day. The wings were commanded by the Emperor's nephews, Ras Haile Maryam Gugsa over the left wing and Ras Mengesha the right. Disaster struck when Ras Haile Maryam Gugsa was killed by gunfire, causing the Emperor to move forward and take personal command. The Ethiopians concentrated their attack against one part of the defense and managed to break through the Mahdist lines. The division of Ali wad Hilu was almost completely destroyed. The Ethiopians poured into the town in search of plunder and began to ruthlessly butcher women and children. The Sudanese defenders were about to break completely, when the battle turned unexpectedly in their favour.

Emperor Yohannes, who led his army from the front, had shrugged off one bullet wound to his hand, but a second lodged in his chest, fatally wounded him. He was carried back to his tent, where he died that night. Before he died, Yohannes commanded his nobles to recognize his natural son, Ras Mengesha, as his successor. The Ethiopians, demoralized by the death of their ruler, began a general retreat, taking with them whatever loot they could seize.

The Sudanese were too exhausted to pursue, but when on the following day the attack was not renewed they learned, that their enemy was falling back towards the Atbara river. The Mahdists were unaware of the Emperor's death until "stench from the rapidly decaying imperial corpse alerted a spy, and the nearly beaten Sudanese thundered out of their zariba to scatter the downcast Ethiopians like starlings." On 12 March, the forces of the Sudanese commander, Zeki Tummal, overtook the rearguard led by Ras Alula near the Atbara River, who were escorting the Emperor's body to safety. The Mahdists inflicted heavy losses upon the Ethiopians and captured the body of the dead Emperor, whose head they cut off and sent back to Omdurman as a trophy.

== Aftermath ==
Yohannes' head was brought back to Omdurman and displayed in the Khalifa's court. The Khalifa was reportedly overjoyed at this victory. Despite this victory, the Mahdists suffered heavy losses, Zeki Tummal's army, which before the war numbered not fewer than 87,000, could only mobilize 10,000 men in the spring of 1890. Never again were the Mahdists able to put so great a force in the field.

The death of the Emperor caused a period of political turmoil in Ethiopia. Yohannes on his deathbed named his son Ras Mengesha as his heir, and begged Ras Alula and his other nobles to support him. However, Tigray was in disarray, famine had broken out and chiefs were fighting amongst themselves. Though Alula urged Mengesha to declare himself Emperor, Mengesha refused realizing that without the unequivocal support from all of Tigray no-one would take his bid for the throne seriously. Within a matter of weeks Menelik II was recognized as the new emperor, thus cementing Shoan domination over Ethiopia.

After Menelik's accession to the throne, he would seek friendly relations with the Mahdists. When Menelik denounced the Treaty of Wuchale in 1893, the Khalifa Abdallahi ibn Muhammad sent an emissary to Ethiopia. On the eve of the First Italo-Ethiopian War, Menelik sent a letter to the Khalifa stating:

When you were at war with Emperor Yohannes, I was also fighting against him, there has never been a war between us. Now we are confronted by an enemy worse than ever. The enemy has come to enslave both of us. We are of the same color. Therefore, we must cooperate to get rid of our common enemy.

Due to the growing pressure of the colonial powers, the Khalifa was susceptible to the friendly overture of Menelik and sent small raiding parties to Italian Eritrea, but they were easily repulsed. After the Mahdist defeat seemed inevitable, Menelik declared the Mahdists as enemies of the empire and sent an expedition to seize the gold producing region of Bani Shangul (now the Benishangul region in western Ethiopia), incorporating it into Ethiopia by 1897.
