= Battle of the Dindar River =

1744 battle

Battle of the Dinder River
Date	March/April 1744
Location	Modern Sennar, Sudan
Result	Sennar victory

Belligerents
Sennar	Ethiopia

Commanders and leaders
Badi IV; Khamis; Muhammad Abu Likayik	(Ethiopian Empire) Iyasu II (Ethiopian Empire) Wolde Leul

Strength
4,000 cavalry	18,000 infantry

The Battle of the Dindar River was fought near the Dinder River in 1744, between the forces of the Ethiopian Emperor Iyasu II and the Sennar army under King Badi IV. The battle was a disaster for the Ethiopians and for Iyasu.

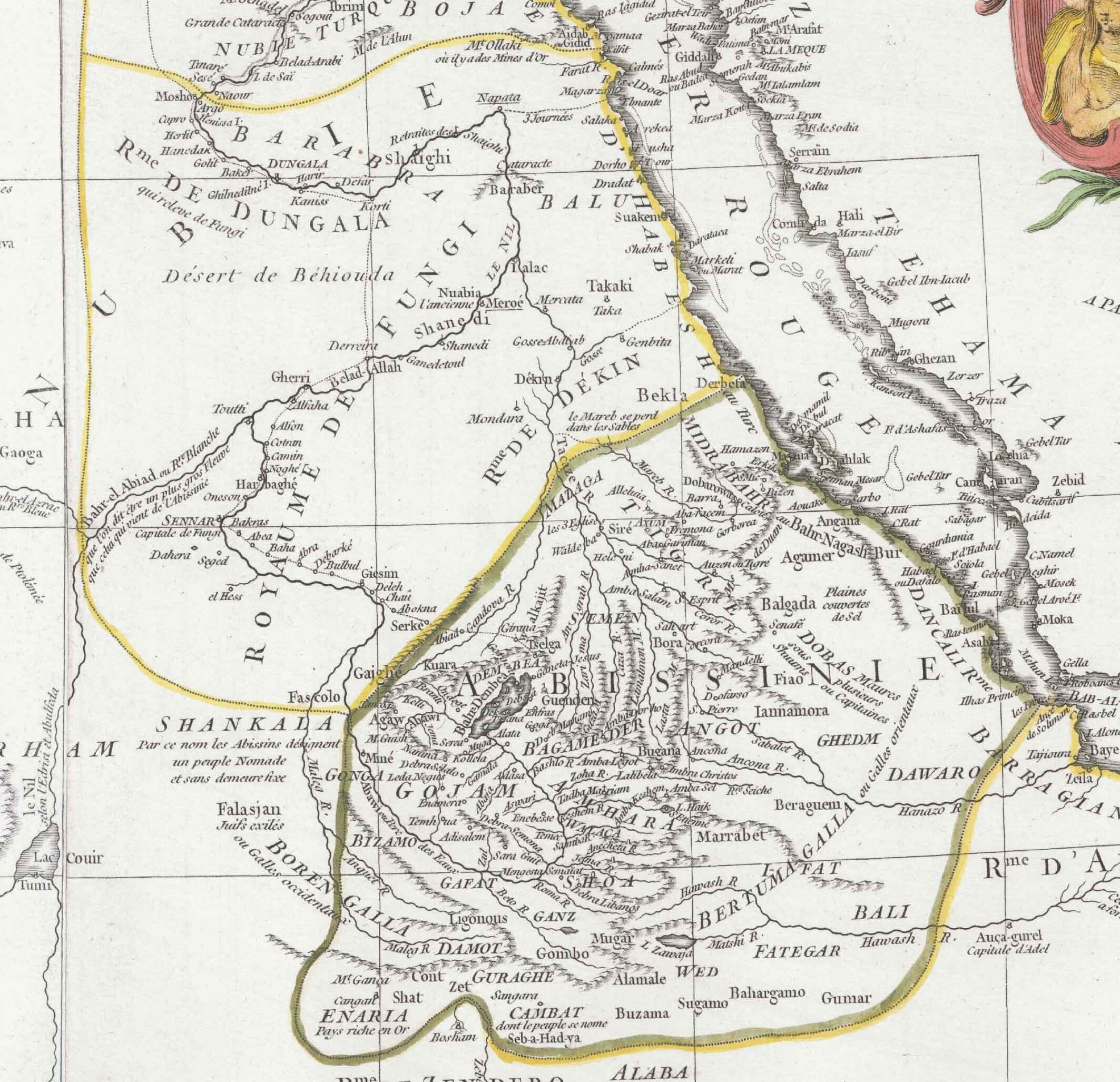
The Funj Sultanate and the Ethiopian Empire in a map by Jean-Baptiste d'Anville, 1749

== Prelude ==
Stung by lampoons which called him Iyasu Tannush ("Iyasu the Little", in contrast to his earlier namesake "Iyasu the Great") and described him as more interested in pursuing his pleasures and amusements than to the well-being of his own subjects, Emperor Iyasu decided to conquer the Kingdom of Sennar. He summoned the army of Ethiopia, and marched west from Gondar into Sennar, following the course of the Dindar River.

The inhabitants of Sennar fell back before the overwhelming force of the Ethiopians, although some under Nail Wad Agib defected to the Ethiopians and saved their lives for the moment. Some local inhabitants along the Dindar (whom Wallis Budge describes as "Arabs") opposed the invaders, but Iyasu's general Waragna, commanding the vanguard of the army, scattered them "with great slaughter".

== Battle ==
Although King Badi had assembled an army, he was unnerved at the size of the Ethiopian army before him. However, Khamis, a prince of Darfur in western Sudan, proposed a strategy to defeat the invaders. On his advice, the main part of the Sennar army feigned a retreat from the Ethiopian army, drawing them forward. Meanwhile, Khamis led 4000 horsemen around and behind the army and fell upon the main body of 18,000 men under the command of Wolde Leul. Welda Uhlo escaped with some of his officers, and a number of soldiers found safety in the nearby woods, but the rest were slaughtered in Khamis' attack. Khamis also captured a number of relics that Emperor Iyasu had brought with him, which included an icon of Christ and a piece of the True Cross. While a follower of Nail Wad Agib brought word of the ambush to the vanguard with Emperor Iyasu, it was clear that they would be unable to reach the fighting in time to save them.

== Aftermath ==
Instead, Emperor Iyasu followed the main stream of the Nile north to where the Tekezé River entered it, wreaking destruction upon the villages he encountered, burning houses and capturing cattle. Once he reached the Tekezé, Iyasu followed that river upstream into his realm. Upon entering Gondar, the Emperor paraded the cattle his soldiers had captured proclaiming his campaign a success.
