= Isma'il of Sennar =

Isma'il (c. 1736–1776) was the ruler of the Kingdom of Sennar (r. 1768–1776). He was the son of king Badi IV, and brother of his predecessor Nasir.

The Scottish traveller James Bruce was his unwilling guest from 1 May to 5 September 1772, and acted as a physician to Isma'il's three wives. Bruce left this portrait of Isma'il:

His head was uncovered; he wore his own short black hair, and was as white in colour as an Arab. He seemed to be a man about thirty-four, his feet were bare but covered by his shirt. He had a very plebeian countenance, on which was stamped no decided character; I should rather have guessed him to be a soft, timid, irresolute man.

Bruce summarized Isma'il's political position at the time of his visit as follows, based on conversations with the Royal Executioner, Ahmed Sid el-Koum:

Ismain, the present king, stood upon very precarious ground; that both brothers, Adelan and Abou Kalec, were at the head of armies in the field; that Kittou [brother of Adelan and Abou Kalec] had at his disposal all the forces that were in Sennar; and that the king was little esteemed, and had neither experience, courage, friends, money, nor troops.

== Notes ==
Preceded by Nasir	King of Sennar	Succeeded by Adlan II
