= Nicolangelo Carnimeo =

Italian general (1887–1965)

Nicolangelo Carnimeo

Nicolangelo Carnimeo (6 July 1887 – 10 August 1965) was an Italian general of World War II and a politician in the Italian Republic.

Carnimeo was born in Bari on 6 July 1887. He graduated in law and political sciences and in 1909 was commissioned as an officer in the Royal Italian Army in 1909. He served during both the Italo-Turkish War and the First World War. From 1940 to 1941, as a brigadier general during the East African Campaign of the Second World War, he commanded the 2nd Eritrean Division in Italian East Africa and led the X Territorial Defence Command. He fought the brilliant, if doomed, defence in the Battle of Keren, one of the major feats of arms of Italy in the war, and was promoted to major general afterwards. He himself highly esteemed the bravery of the Indian troops in the service of the British Empire he faced in Africa. He ended the war as lieutenant general and later was a legal-administrative judge and then a member of Parliament of the Italian Republic. General Carnimeo died in Naples on 10 August 1965.

== See also ==
- East African Campaign (World War II)
