= Tukrir =

In Ethiopia and Eritrea, the terms Tukrīr (Amharic) and Tǝk^{w}ǝrir (Note: Also Tukrir, plural Täk^{w}arir) (Tigrinya) are used to designate persons of West or Central African origin. The terms derives from the city and kingdom of Takrūr that thrived on the lower Senegal River in the eleventh century. The place was well known to Arab geographers, and an inhabitant of Takrūr or of West Africa in general was called in Arabic a Takrūrī (plural Takārīr or Takārna) from the 14th century onward. The nisba al-Takrūrī was a common surname for one of West African descent. The Ethiopian terms are derived from the Arabic language.

The Tukrīr primarily inhabit the western edge of the Ethiopian Highlands. They are overwhelmingly Muslim. They are mainly Fulani and Hausa in origin from the region of the former Kanem–Bornu Empire. There were two major periods of immigration from West Africa to Ethiopia. The first coincided with the Fula jihads that lasted from 1804 until 1842; the second with the Scramble for Africa, when West Africa was colonized by Europeans between 1885 and 1914.

In the 19th century there was a Tukrīr sheikhdom with its capital at Metemma, sometimes owing tribute to Ethiopia and at other times to Egypt. The Takrur were from an earlier colony of west African peoples in Darfur and obtained permission from the Emperor of Ethiopia to make a permanent settlement there. It thus ended up dominated by Fur from the nearby Sultanate of Darfur. One notable ruler of the Tukrir was Sheikh Miri, who has been described as "probably the most celebrated of these border chiefs." The Sheikh formed an alliance with the Khedive some time after Muhammad Ali of Egypt had conquered the Sennar sultanate in 1821, and proclaimed himself independent of the Ethiopian Empire. He accompanied the Egyptians to the Battle of Kalnabu, during which the Muslim army was defeated and he was slain. It sided with the Mahdists during the Mahdist War against Ethiopia (1885–1891) and disappeared with the Mahdists' defeat.

The term Fallāta (from Fulani) has largely replaced Takārīr in the Sudan as a term for immigrants from West Africa.
