= Al-Shater Bossely Abdul Jalil =

Egyptian anthropologist and historian

60s

Al-Shater Bossely Abdul Jalil (الشاطر بصيلي عبد الجليل; 1901–1977) was an Egyptian writer, historian, and anthropologist.

== Early life and career ==
Abdul Jalil was born in Aswan, Egypt, in 1901. He attended Cairo University, where he studied history and anthropology.

Abdul Jalil served under the Sudan Government from 1919 to 1951. After 1951, he worked as the Librarian of the Institute of Sudanese Studies at Cairo University.

== Published works ==
Abdul Jalil's primary scholarly work, An Outline History of the Nile Valley Sudan (Arabic: معالم تاريخ سودان وادي النيل), was published in 1955 by Abu Fadil Press in Cairo. The work was reviewed in the Bulletin of the School of Oriental and African Studies in 1957 and in Antiquity magazine in 1956.

Abdul Jalil also edited The Manuscript of Katib al-Shuna (Arabic: مخطوطة كاتب الشونة في تاريخ السلطنة السنارية والإدارة المصرية), a historical manuscript on the Funj Sultanate, published in 1961.

== Legacy ==
Abdul Jalil died in 1977. His research on Sudanese history has been cited by scholars of African history, including by historian Jay Spaulding in his work on the Funj Sultanate.
