= Adlan II =

18th-century ruler of the Kingdom of Sennar

Adlan II (died 1789) was the ruler of the Kingdom of Sennar (1776–1789).

He defeated the Vizier Rajab of Sennar and Fiki Haji Mohammed Majdub in the Battle of Taras in 1787.

== Notes ==
Preceded by Isma'il	King of Sennar	Succeeded by Awkal
