= Iyoas I =

Emperor of Ethiopia from 1755 to 1769

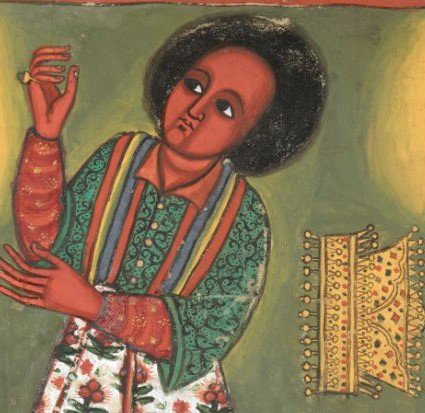
- Iyoas I depicted in an 18th-century Ethiopian manuscript

Emperor of Ethiopia
- Reign: 27 June 1755 – 7 May 1769
- Predecessor: Iyasu II
- Successor: Yohannes II
- Regent: Mentewab
- Born: 1754
- Died: 14 May 1769 (aged 14–15)
- Burial: Gondar, Ethiopia
- Dynasty: Solomonic dynasty
- Father: Iyasu II

Iyoas I (Ge'ez: ኢዮአስ; 1754 – 14 May 1769), throne name Adyam Sagad (Ge'ez: አድያም ሰገድ) was Emperor of Ethiopia from 27 June 1755 to 7 May 1769, and a member of the Solomonic dynasty. He was the infant son of Iyasu II and Wubit (Welete Bersabe), the daughter of an Oromo chieftain of the Karrayyu.

== Iyoas and Mentewab ==
Despite his extreme youth, he was the candidate proposed by Empress Mentewab, his grandmother, who then acted as his regent. Her proposal was supported by the great nobles of the reign, Ras Wolde Leul her brother, Waragna, Ayo governor of Begemder, and Ras Mikael Sehul. One handicap with this tactic of ruling through a proxy, as Richard Pankhurst points out, was that neither Iyoas, due to his age, nor Empress Mentewab, due to her sex, could operate far from the capital city of Gondar, and relied on Waragna and her brothers to lead many of the military campaigns. The very first challenge to Iyoas' rule, when Nanna Giyorgis rebelled in Damot out of envy for Waragna's increased influence in the court, had to be suppressed by a force led by Waragna and the Empress' brother Grazmach Eshte.

Another problem grew from Mentewab's arrangement of the marriage of her son to Wubit, the daughter of an Oromo chieftain. Iyasu II gave precedence to his mother and allowed her every prerogative as a crowned co-ruler, while his wife Wubit suffered in obscurity. Wubit waited for the accession of her own son to make a bid for the power wielded for so long by Mentewab and her relatives from Qwara Province.

When Iyoas assumed the throne upon his father's sudden death, the aristocrats of Gondar were stunned to find that he more readily spoke in the Oromo language rather than in Amharic, and favored his mother's Oromo relatives over the Qwarans of his grandmothers family, or the Gondarine nobility that had surrounded the Solomonic monarchs since the reign of Fasiledes. His preference of the Oromo only increased when Iyoas reached adulthood. He assembled a Royal Guard with 3000 of that people, and put his Oromo uncles Birale and Lubo, the brothers of Wubit, in command of them. On the death of the Ras of Amhara province, he attempted to promote his uncle Lubo governor of that province, but the outcry led his uncle Wolde Leul to convince him to change his mind.

In 1764 Ras Mikael Sehul returned to the capital city of Gondar, and convinced Iyoas to support Badi abu Shalukh, the exiled king of Sennar. Iyoas made Badi governor of Ras al-Fil along the border with Sennar, and Wolde Leul advised Badi to remain in Ras al-Fil; however the exiled king was lured back into Sennar where he was quietly executed.

Not long after this, Iyoas' great uncle Wolde Leul died (March 1767), which James Bruce described was the signal for all parties to engage in a civil war. The two sides were roughly aligned around the two rival Dowager Empresses, Mentewab and Wubit (Welete Bersabe). "Nothing had withheld them but his prudence and authority." The anti-Oromo party found their champion in Ya Mariam Bariaw, the son of Ayo (who had helped to make Iyoas emperor) and governor of Begemder, and who was supported by Grazmach Eshte. The Grazmach was made governor of Damot whose governor, Waragna, had died some years before. However, the Jawa Oromo inhabiting Damot preferred to be ruled by Waragna's son Fasil; when Grazmach Eshte arrived in Damot, he was assassinated and Fasil proclaimed governor in his place; according to Bruce, Iyoas' uncles Birale and Lubo convinced him to confirm Fasil in that position.

At this point, Ya Mariam Bariaw's pride led to his losing the governorship of Begemder, replaced by the emperor's Oromo uncle Birale. Because the governorship of Begemder included being custodian of Mount Wehni, Ya Mariam Bariaw was horrified at the prospect of an outsider holding this important trust, and is said to have begged the emperor to instead appoint any other ruler to this post. (Or so a document later published by Ras Mikael Sehul, and according to Bruce, at the instigation of Aster Iyasu, the daughter of Empress Mentewab.) Despite the outcry of the non-Oromo elite, and Ya Mariam Bariaw's pledge to stop Birale at the Well of Fernay, Iyoas persisted in his decision, and sent his bodyguard to assist Birale's own followers to assume the government of Begemder. In the ensuing battle Ya Mariam Bariaw was victorious, but despite his explicit orders that Birale should either be captured or allowed to escape, his opponent was killed. Upon learning this, Ya Mariam Bariaw predicted, "Michael, and all the army of Tigre, will march against me before autumn."

== Enter Ras Mikael ==
Once he learned of the death of his uncle Birale, Iyoas sent to Tigray's Ras Mikael Sehul for help. Ras Mikael had established himself as the most powerful lord of Ethiopia, at one point having amassed some 6,000 matchlocks—six times the total number in the rest of Ethiopia. Ras Mikael first replied to the envoys that the emperor's conduct would "end in the ruin of his family, and the state in general." Then, although extolling Ya Mariam Bariaw as "the only man in Abyssinia that knew his duty, and had courage to persevere in it", immediately set forth for Gondar, "his army encumbered by no baggage, not even provisions, women or tents, nor useless beasts of burden." He marched swiftly through Wegera, cutting a swath of destruction as he marched for the capital. However, instead of taking Gondar by storm, the Ras simply took control of the city's sources of water and every entrance into Gondar; as Bruce puts it, "he intended to terrify, but to do no more." The day after his arrival, Ras Mikael visited the emperor Iyoas, then his mother. After establishing himself as the undisputed ruler of the capital, marched on Ya Mariam Bariaw from Gondar to Begemder—only after insisting that the emperor be the leader of this expedition, at least in name.

Upon learning of this new army, Ya Mariam Bariaw, who had remained near the site of his victory, fell back into Begemder, first to Filakit Gereger, then to Nefas Mewcha "in the farthest limits of his province" (in Bruce's words) where the armies met. In the battle that followed Ya Mariam Bariaw was defeated, and severely wounded; he fled to the nearby province of the Wollo Oromo, who returned him to Iyoas with twelve of his principal officers. Although it appeared that the emperor, moved by the pitiful sight of Ya Mariam Bariaw covered with blood from his open wound lying supine before him, was about to pardon this rebel, his uncle Lubo spoke up and demanded, as was his right by traditional Ethiopian law, for Maryam Bariya to delivered to him for what punishment he believed was appropriate; Lubo killed the noble himself by slitting Ya Mariam Bariaw's throat. Shocked at this act, the emperor's own officers allowed the other twelve captives, who included Wand Bewossen, to escape.

The murder of Ya Mariam Bariaw only deepened Ras Mikael's scorn for Iyoas. Eventually Mikael Sehul deposed the emperor Iyoas (7 May 1769); one week later, Mikael Sehul had him killed. Although the details of his death are contradictory, the result was clear: for the first time an emperor had lost his throne in a means other than his own natural death, death in battle, or voluntary abdication. Mikael Sehul had compromised the power of the emperor, and from this point forward it lay ever more openly in the hands of the great nobles and military commanders. As Edward Ullendorff notes,

It is this period, from 1769 to the beginning of Theodore's [How the british referred to Emperor Tewodros] reign in 1855, that is called by Ethiopian tradition the time of the masafent ("judges"), for it resembled very closely the era of the Old Testament judges when "there was no king in Israel: every man did that which was right in his own eyes".

Both the Empress Mentewab and his mother Wubit were devastated at the death of Iyoas. Empress Mentewab was distraught at the death of her grandson. She arranged for him to be buried at her retreat at Qusquam, and retired permanently to her palace there, refusing to return to the capital for the rest of her life. Although she lived through the next three reigns, she played a minimal role in them.

Regnal titles
Preceded by Iyasu II	Emperor of Ethiopia; 1755–1769	Succeeded by Yohannes II
