= Gallabat =

Gallabat القلابات
- Village
- Location in Sudan
- Coordinates: 12°58′N 36°09′E
- Country: Sudan
- State: Al Qadarif
- Time zone: UTC+3 (EAT)

Gallabat (Arabic: القلابات) is a village in the Sudanese state of Al Qadarif. It lies at one of the country's border crossing points with Ethiopia; on the other side of the border is Ethiopia's corresponding border village Metemma.

== History ==
The town and district form a small ethnographical island in Al Qadarif, having been founded in the 18th century by a colony of Takruri from Darfur, who, finding the spot a convenient resting-place for their fellow-pilgrims on their way to Mecca and back, obtained permission from the Emperor of Ethiopia to make a permanent settlement there. Lying on the main trade route from Sennar to Gondar (some 90 miles to the east) as well as being the center of the frontier province of Ras al-Fil, Gallabat grew into a trade center of some importance. The Scottish explorer James Bruce (who calls the town Hor-Cacamoot) spent two months in the town in 1772, disabled with dysentery which was cured only by the herbs of a local medicine-man and the attentions of his companion Yasin.

One notable ruler of Gallabat was Sheikh Miri, who has been described as "probably the most celebrated of these border chiefs". The Sheikh formed an alliance with the Khedive some time after Muhammad Ali of Egypt had conquered the Sennar sultanate in 1821, and proclaimed himself independent of the Ethiopian Empire. He accompanied the Egyptians in their raid on Gondar, but apparently escaped the ambush which the Dejazmach ('Commander of the main army') Kenfu Hailu had sprung on the raiders. In 1838 Emperor Tewodros avenged the sack of Gondar with an attack on Gallabat; Sheikh Miri, with many of the Takruri, was killed.

In about 1870, the Egyptians garrisoned Gallabat. In 1886, the town was attacked by followers of Abdallahi ibn Muhammad (the successor of Muhammad Ahmad) and sacked. From Gallabat, a Mahdist raiding party penetrated to Gondar in Ethiopia. The Mahdists then looted Gondar. In March 1889, in revenge, an Ethiopian army under Emperor Yohannes IV attacked the Mahdists close to Gallabat in what is known as the Battle of Gallabat (or Metemma). Yohannes IV was originally successful, with the Mahdists suffering many casualties, but a shot from a lone sniper killed the Emperor late in the battle, causing his army to flee and routing the attack.

In 1899 the Mahdists were decisively defeated in the Sudan by British and Egyptian forces during the Battle of Umm Diwaykarat. After the even more decisive Battle of Omdurman, Mahdist rule in the Sudan was at an end. From 1899 to 1956, Gallabat was located in what was known as the Anglo-Egyptian Sudan.

In July 1940 during the East African Campaign, Italian forces advancing from Italian East Africa forced a small British garrison commanded by Wilfred Thesiger to withdraw from Gallabat to the pass at Khor el Otrub. The Italians then occupied the town until November when the British under Brigadier Slim launched an attack to take the town back, but due to poor morale of the Essex Regiment and lack of coordination by the British bombers, failed to capture Metemma.

In 1991 British television presenter Michael Palin travelled through Gallabat on his way to Gonder for the television show Pole to Pole.
