= Joseph Ohrwalder =

Roman Catholic priest

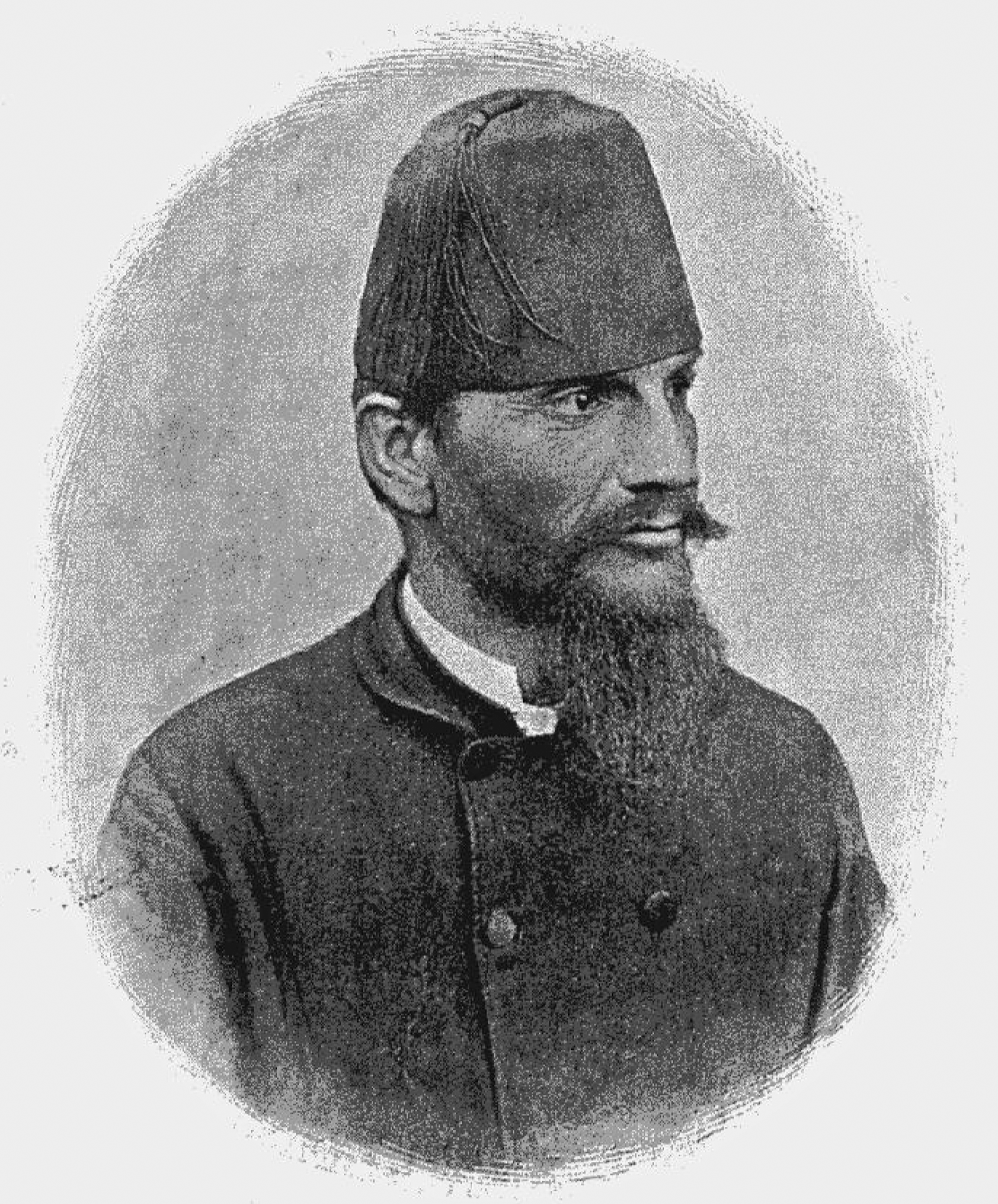
Josef Ohrwalder

Father Joseph Ohrwalder (6 March 1856 Lana, South Tyrol – 8 August 1913 Omdurman/Sudan)

Born in Lana, County of Tyrol in the Austro-Hungarian Empire, Ohrwalder was a Roman Catholic priest, who was taken captive by the Mahdists in Sudan while working as a missionary there and escaped ten years later. The German manuscript of his travels was rendered into English by Francis Reginald Wingate from a sketchy translation. Wingate had helped him escape from Sudan.
