= Ras al-Fil =

Former governorate in Ethiopia

Ras al-Fil (Arabic: lit. 'head of the elephant') was a former governorate of the Christian Ethiopian state, located in modern day Sudan to the west of the river Atbara and market town Mätämma.

Ras al-Fil seems to have been the principal market for gold on a caravan route between Gonder, Sinnar and Fung, often frequented by Säbärti as well as Sinnar merchants. It was a four day journey from Sinnar, and was considered one of the safest trade routes between the two countries. Though its territorial extent is unclear, Ras al-Fil once consisted of 39 villages.

After the military expedition of Atse Iyasu II and Ras Wäldä Léul against them, Ras al-Fil no longer paid tribute to Sinnar and became one of Ethiopia's frontier provinces. Most of its inhabitants were expert horsemen. At the time of James Bruce's visit, it was ruled by a Christian called Ato Kénfu. Bruce was offered a deputy governorship that he did not exercise actively owing to its unfavourable location. Badi IV and fled to sanctuary in Ethiopia, where Ras Mikael Sehul convinced Emperor Iyoas I to appoint him governor of the province of Ras al-Fil. After the 18th century, it seems to have belonged to the Qallabat sultanate.

== See also ==
Ras Filuk, also known as "Ras Fil"
