= Badi IV =

Ruler of Sennar

Badi IV (reigned 1724–1762; died 1764), also known as Badi abu Shilluk, was a ruler of the Kingdom of Sennar. He was the son of his predecessor, Nul.

When Emperor Iyasu II of Ethiopia invaded his realm in 1738, the army of Sennar under the leadership of Hamis, a prince of Darfur, inflicted a significant defeat to the invaders at the Battle of the Dindar River.

He was deposed by his son, Nasir, with the help of his vizier Sheikh Adelan and his brother Abu Kalec the governor of Kordofan. Badi fled to sanctuary in Ethiopia, where Ras Mikael Sehul became his mentor. Ras Mikael convinced Emperor Iyoas I to appoint him governor of the province of Ras al-Fil, near the border with Sennar. However, despite the advice of Ras Wolde Leul, one of Iyoas' senior counselors, envoys from Sennar convinced Badi to return to Sennar where he was quietly murdered after an imprisonment of two years.

The Scottish explorer James Bruce adds that Badi was killed by Welled Hassan, the governor of Atbara; because Welled Hassan had killed the king "with a lance, whereas the only lawful instrument was a sword", the governor was afterwards put to death.

One of the earliest existing charters for Sennar was issued in Badi's reign. It is a grant of immunity from taxes, dated A.H. 1145 (A.D. 1732/1733), Badi gave to the faqih Bishara, confirming a similar grant given to his father, faqih Ali b. Bursi.

== Notes ==
Preceded by Nul	King of Sennar	Succeeded by Nasir
