= Metemma =

Town in northwestern Ethiopia

Metemma መተማ
- Town
- Location in Ethiopia
- Coordinates: 12°58′N 36°12′E
- Country: Ethiopia
- Region: Amhara Region
- Zone: North Gondar Zone
- Elevation: 685 m (2,247 ft)

Population (2005 est.)
  - Total: 5,581
- Time zone: UTC+3 (EAT)

Metemma (Amharic: መተማ), also known as Metemma Yohannes, is a town in northwestern Ethiopia, on the border with Sudan. Located in the Semien Gondar Zone of the Amhara Region, Metemma has a latitude and longitude of 12°58′N 36°12′E with an elevation of 685 meters above sea level. Across the border is the corresponding Sudanese village of Gallabat.

Metemma hosts an airport (ICAO code HAMM, IATA ETE).

== Etymology ==
According to the British diplomat Hormuzd Rassam, who travelled through Metemma in November 1865 on his diplomatic mission to Emperor Tewodros II, "Metemma" comes from the Arabic word for "the place of cutting, or termination – indicating the end of the Muslim provinces", although at the time the settlement was better known as Suk ul-Gallabat ("The market of Gallabat").

== History ==
=== Origins ===
The town traces its origins to the 18th century, when a colony of Tukrir from Darfur finding the spot a convenient resting-place for their fellow-pilgrims on their way to Mecca and back, obtained permission from the Emperor of Ethiopia to make a permanent settlement there. However Hormuz Rassam records a different account, stating "within the last century" (i.e., the 18th century) the rulers of Metemma were in constant war with their counterparts at Er-Rashid and constituted their armies with slaves taken from Kurdufan and Darfur. These foreign conscripts eventually revolted and killed the "so-called Arab chief", making one of their own number ruler.

Lying on the main trade route from Sennar to Gondar (some 90 miles to the east by south), Metemma/Gallabat grew into a trade center of some importance. The Scottish explorer James Bruce (who called the town Hor-Cacamoot) travelled through the town in 1772. This location not only made the settlement a major marketplace, but also a major slave market in the 19th century. Richard Pankhurst has published estimates of the number of people sold in this market during the 19th century that range between 10,000 and 20,000. By 1881, European visitors reported that the Emperor Yohannes IV had ordered the slave market closed.

=== 20th century ===
During the Second Italo-Ethiopian War, the East African Fast Column (Colonna Celere dell'Africa Orientale) of General Achille Starace, which consisted of one Eritrean battalion, one squadron mounted on camels, 1 platoon of light tanks and more than 400 vehicles, seized the town of Metemma on 12 April 1936. During the occupation, the Italians built a mosque in the town. After war was declared between the British and Italian Empires, the Italians crossed the border and occupied Gallabat. But the British recaptured the town 6 November 1940 with the intent of then capturing Metemma; however, the attack on Metemma failed miserably and the British were forced to evacuate Gallabat again. They occupied Metemma for good on 19 January 1941.

The trade route through Metemma remained important up to the beginning of the 20th century, but the introduction of rail transport to Sudan, as well as improvements to the roads inside Ethiopia robbed the town of its importance, until by E.C. 1944 (AD 1952) an official survey found only 129 thatched and corrugated-roof houses in Metemma, of which "fourteen were government properties, three were owned by nagades and twelve were empty -- probably reserved for renting."

During the Ethiopian Civil War, Metemma was captured by the Ethiopian Democratic Union (EDU) on 13 January 1977, who attacked from positions inside Sudan. The town was taken from the EDU by the Ethiopian People's Revolutionary Democratic Front (EPRDF) on 7 October 1990, claiming to have killed 28 of its enemy forces, wounded 21, and captured 16.

=== 21st century ===
A road to Al Qadarif of good standard was completed mid-March 2002, allowing import and export goods to be sent through Port Sudan, where an area had been reserved for Ethiopian goods and containers.

During the Sudanese refugee crisis starting in 2023, thousands of Sudanese refugees were reported arriving in Metemma. A Human Rights Watch (HRW) report alleges that Sudanese refugees in Metemma have experienced multiple incidents of violence, abductions, and forced labor amid the conflict between government forces and Fano militias, however the Ethiopian government has denied these claims.

On 1 September 2024, Fano seized Metemma, aiming to cut off supplies of fuel and food coming across the border. After being disarmed, Sudanese authorities allowed ENDF troops to retreat into Sudan and promptly close the Gallabat side of the border. On 21 October 2024, the border crossing was reopened after Metemma was recaptured by the Ethiopian Army several weeks before, though it was unclear exactly when it was recaptured.

== Demographics ==
Based on figures from the Central Statistical Agency of Ethiopia published in 2005, Metemma has an estimated total population of 5,581, with 3,132 males and 2,449 females. The 1994 census reported this town had a total population of 3,183 of whom 1,648 were males and 1,535 were females. It is one of three towns in Metemma woreda.
