= Wadi Halfa Salient =

Disputed territory between Egypt and Sudan

- Disputed territory
- Map of the claims of Sudan and Egypt. The Wadi Halfa Salient is the elbow-shaped area in the middle, colored in dark green.

- Location between Egypt and the Sudan
- Coordinates: 22°05′31″N 31°24′20″E
- Time zone: UTC+2 (EST)
  - Summer (DST): +3

The Wadi Halfa Salient, named after Wadi Halfa, a nearby Sudanese city 22 kilometers south of the border, is a salient of the international border between Egypt and the Sudan along the Nile River to the north. The area is controlled by Egypt. The area (along with the Halaib Triangle and Bir Tawil) is created by two different definitions of the Egypt–Sudan border: the "political boundary" set in 1899, and the "administrative boundary" set in 1902.

== History ==
In 1899, the border between the Anglo-Egyptian Sudan and Egypt was defined by the condominium treaty to run along the 22nd degree north of latitude. However, access to the area north of the border along the Nile River and consequently the administration of the population of the area were easier from Sudan. Therefore, in 1902 a new administrative border was established, deviating north of the 22nd degree north latitude along the Nile River, thereby placing this area under Sudanese administration.

Besides the Wadi Halfa Salient, there are two more areas where the administrative border deviated from the 22nd degree north latitude, both to the east of Wadi Halfa: the Halaib Triangle on the Red Sea coast, north of the original 1899 border, and the much smaller area around Bir Tawil, south of the original border.

== Political situation ==
Egypt claims the more favorable original border of 1899 along the 22nd degree north of latitude and therefore claims both the Halaib Triangle and the Wadi Halfa Salient, but not the Bir Tawil area. Since Sudan claims the amended border of 1902, it also claims the Halaib Triangle and the Wadi Halfa Salient, while no country claims the Bir Tawil area, making it de facto a terra nullius. While there have been disputes about the Halaib Triangle and military occupation by Egypt, the small area of the Wadi Halfa Salient remained out of the headlines because most of the area is now flooded by Lake Nasser and the Nubian people who lived in the area have since been resettled elsewhere.

Flooding in the Wadi Halfa Salient

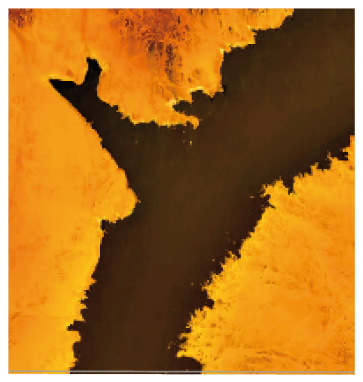
NASA WorldWind Image

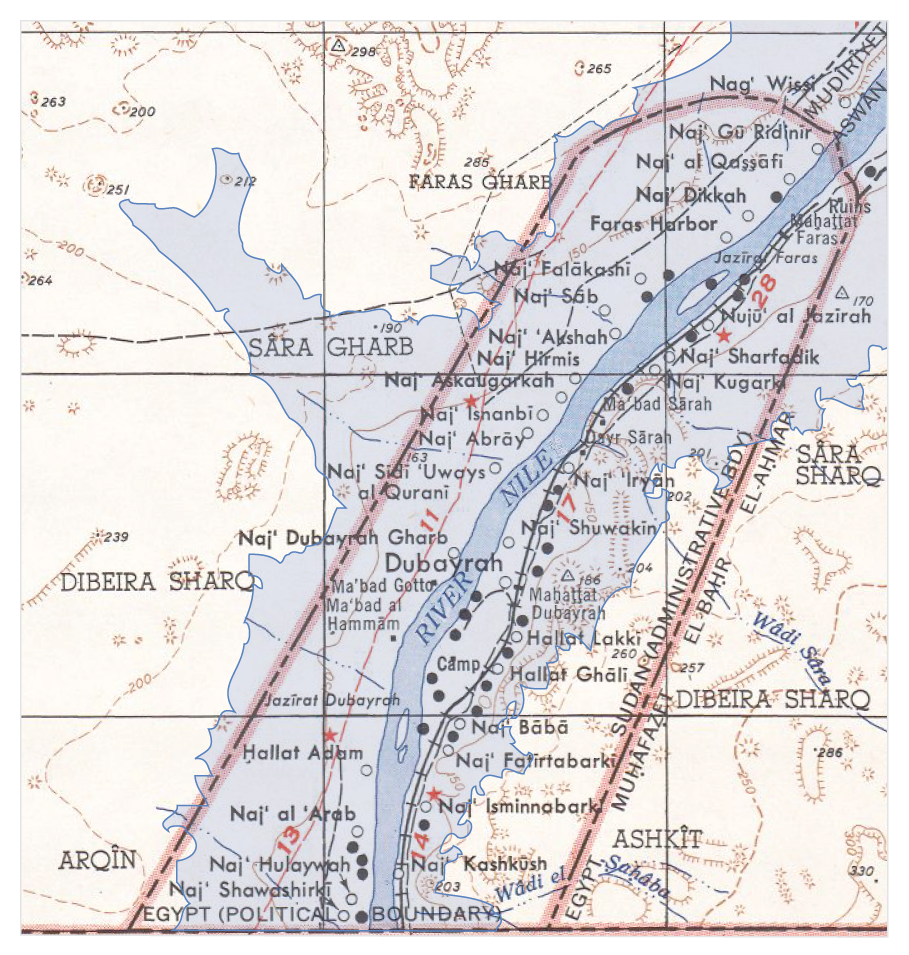
Flooding area superimposed

== Geography ==
The Wadi Halfa Salient is roughly 9 kilometres (5.6 mi) wide and stretches finger-shaped on both sides of the original course of the Nile 25 kilometres (16 mi) to the north into Egyptian territory, with a total area of 210 km^{2} (81 sq mi). Because of the construction of the Aswan Dam and the flooding of Lake Nasser most of the area was flooded, affecting most of the villages of the area and the ancient city of Faras. Some of the people were resettled to New Halfa in the Butana region.

After a detailed map of 1953, before the flooding, 52 villages could be counted in the area, of which 24 were west of the Nile River (17 with names on the map), and 29 east of the river (12 with names), and one unnamed village on the Faras Island in the river. The largest town and only one with a population exceeding 2000 was Dubayrah (Arabic: دبيرة).

A land area of only about 30 to 40 km^{2} (12 to 15 sq mi) remains in the salient, most of it on the eastern banks, a desolate rocky area nearly devoid of vegetation. It is administered by Egypt. A superimposition of the map with current NASA WorldWind satellite images shows the extent of flooding in the area of the salient. All villages shown on the map disappeared in the reservoir.

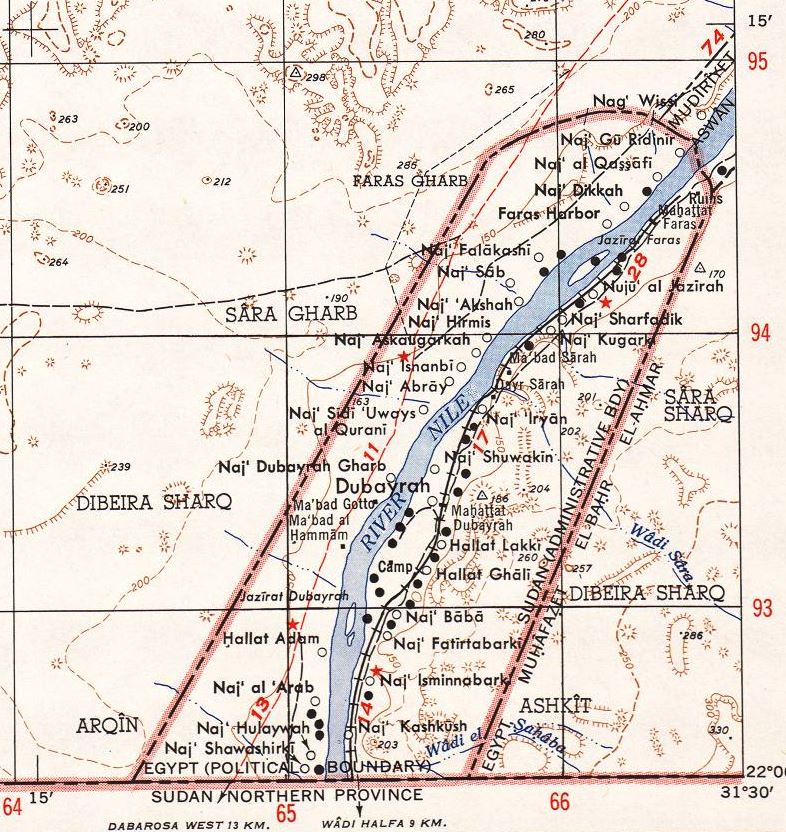
Detail of a U.S. Army map from 1953, before the flooding, showing Wadi Halfa Salient

== See also ==
- Bir Tawil
- Egypt–Sudan border
- Halaib Triangle
