= Egypt–Sudan relations =

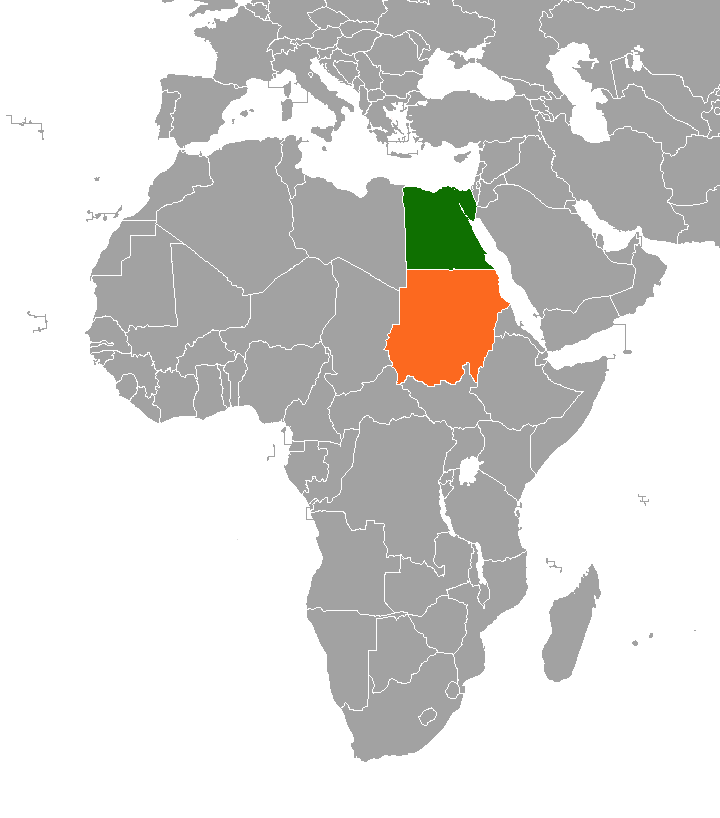

- Egypt: Sudan

Diplomatic mission
- Egyptian embassy, Khartoum: Sudanese embassy, Cairo

Contact between Egypt and Sudan goes back to trade and conflict during ancient times. In 1820, Egypt conquered Sudan, and continued to occupy the country, later as a condominium under the British, until Sudan declared independence in 1956. Sudan later joined the Arab League, of which Egypt is a founding member. Relations between successive governments in Egypt and Sudan have warmed and cooled relations at various times. Relations today are cordial, but tensions remain.

== History ==
=== Ancient relations ===
Contact between Egypt and Sudan goes back to ancient times, when ancient trades routes have roots to 4000 B.C. The ancient Kingdom of Kush in northern Sudan and ancient Egypt engaged in trade, warfare and cultural exchange. During the New Kingdom of Egypt, Egypt conquered further south into Kushite lands. Later, the Kushites would conquer Egypt, founding the Twenty-fifth Dynasty of Egypt. Afterwards, Egypt would fall to the Persians, Greeks, and later Romans. During this time, Christianity spread to Egypt and Sudan. Egypt was conquered by the Rashidun Caliphate in 652 AD, but the caliphate failed to spread into Sudan. A peace treaty was signed between Muslim Egypt and Christian Sudan called the Baqt, lasting centuries. After the Ottomans conquered Egypt, Sudan gradually converted to Islam.

=== Egyptian occupation ===
==== Egyptian conquest and Mahdist uprising ====
While Egypt was a province of the Ottoman Empire, Egypt conquered Sudan, led by the Ottoman Governor Muhammad Ali Pasha, founding the city Khartoum. After the Egyptian-Ottoman Wars from 1831 to 1841, Egypt became an autonomous tributary state of the Ottoman Empire, governed by the Muhammad Ali Dynasty. During this period, British involvement in Egypt grew. An Anglo-French debt commission was formed that assumed responsibility for managing Egypt's fiscal affairs. Isma'il Pasha was eventually forced to abdicate in favor of his more pro-British son, Tawfiq Pasha. The British administrator Charles Gordon was appointed Governor-General of Sudan. A Sudanese religious leader Muhammad Ahmad declared himself the Mahdi and revolted against Egyptian rule. Egypt, with the support of the British, failed to suppress the uprising, and attempted to evacuate Sudan. Though Gordon was to organize the evacuation of Sudan, he found himself in the siege of Khartoum by Mahdist forces, eventually leading to his death. The Mahdist State continued to exist until 1899, when it was defeated by an Anglo-Egyptian force, establishing Anglo-Egyptian rule until 1956. During this time, the British effectively conquered Egypt after suppressing an anti-British uprising in 1882.

==== Condominium Agreement of Anglo-Egyptian Sudan ====
The Condominium Agreement of January 19, 1899 provided for a joint administration of the Sudan by the British and Egyptian governments. Yet it was clear from the outset that Egypt's part of this administration was to be purely nominal. The supreme civil and military command of the Sudan was vested in the governor-general, who was nominated by the British government. Thus his appointment by Khedivial decree had few practical implications. It is, therefore, no wonder that during the whole period of the Condominium, all the governor-generals were British, and owed allegiance to the British government.

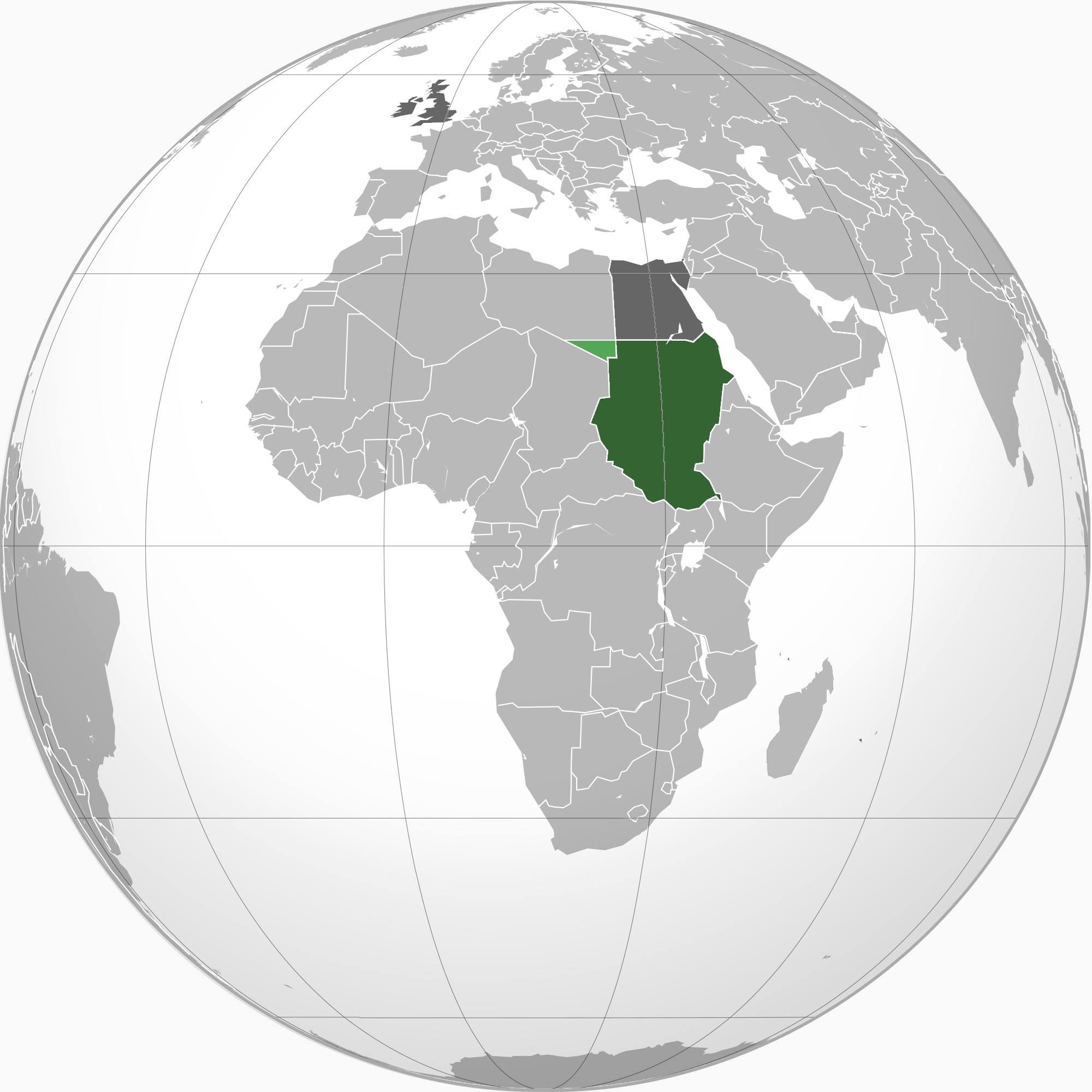
Green: Anglo-Egyptian Sudan Light green: Sarra Triangle ceded to Italian Libya in 1934 Dark grey: Egypt and the United Kingdom

While Sudan was officially a condominium between the governments of Egypt and United Kingdom, divided from Egypt along the 22nd parallel, in reality the British Governor General effectively ruled Sudan as a colony. After the Egyptian revolution of 1919 and declaration of Egyptian independence in 1922, Egyptian nationalists demanded Egyptian authority over Sudan, citing historical connections with 'Unity in the Nile Valley', but British government involvement remained, especially after the assassination of Governor-General Sir Lee Stack, after which Egypt was forced to retreat all forces from Sudan. Egyptian nationalism during this time believed that Sudan rightfully belonged to Egypt, though Sudanese revolutionaries such as the White Flag League supported an independent Sudan. While the Anglo-Egyptian treaty of 1936 allowed Egypt to host troops in Sudan, the Sudan remained a de facto British colony. Two imperial powers, Britain and Egypt, sought to control Sudan. This rivalry led to the rise of Sudanese elites who tended to split into anti-Egyptian and anti-British factions. The National Umma Party under Sayyid Abd al-Rahman al-Mahdi supported Sudanese Independence from Egypt, while the National Unionist Party (NUP) under Ismail al-Azhari favored union with Egypt.

==== 1947 negotiations ====
On January 25, 1947, the British government informed Egypt that it intended to prepare the Sudan for self-government, though Egypt opposed self-government for the Sudan. The Egyptian government sought the removal of British troops in Sudan, and because of the historical connection between Egypt and Sudan, Sudan should be granted self-government under a political union with Egypt. Anti-British resentment in Egypt continued to rise, and on 16 October 1951, the Egyptian government abrogated the agreements underpinning the condominium, and declared that Egypt and Sudan were legally united as the Kingdom of Egypt and Sudan, with King Farouk as the King of Egypt and the Sudan. However, King Farouk was overthrown during the 1952 Egyptian Revolution by the Free Officers Movement, a group of army officers led by Mohamed Naguib and Gamal Abdel Nasser, declaring the Egypt a republic in on June 18, 1953. While Naguib, who was half-Sudanese and spent many years of his childhood in Sudan, supported a union between Egypt and Sudan, a treaty was signed in 1953 allowing Sudanese independence after 3 years. In the 1953 Sudanese parliamentary election, Ismail al-Azhari's NUP received a majority of seats in parliament. Despite winning a majority in the elections, Azhari realized that popular opinion had shifted against an Egyptian-Sudan union. Azhari, who had been the major spokesman for the "unity of the Nile Valley", therefore reversed the NUP's stand and supported Sudanese independence. On December 19, 1955, the Sudanese parliament, under Azhari's leadership, unanimously adopted a declaration of independence that became effective on January 1, 1956, creating the Republic of the Sudan.

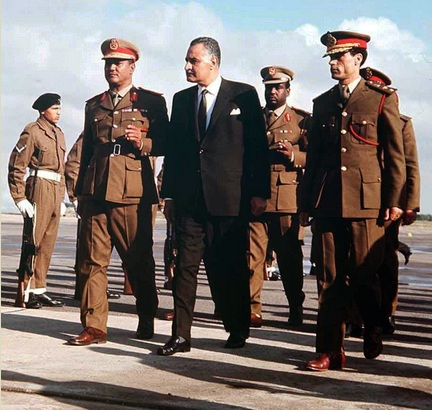
President of Sudan Gaafar Nimeiry (left), President of Egypt Gamal Abdel Nasser, President of Libya Muammar Gaddafi at the Tripoli Airport

=== Relations following Sudanese independence (1956–1969) ===
Nasser was able to politically outmaneuver Naguib, becoming president of Egypt in 1956. Sudan under Azhari had cordial relations with Egypt, until disagreements in 1958 over the border and water resources. In 1958, a coup overthrew Azhari's government, while Egypt and Syria formed the United Arab Republic (UAR), a political union that lasted until Syria seceded in 1961. Relations between the UAR and the new Sudanse government under Prime Minister Abdallah Khalil improved, with both governments signing an agreement over the Nile's water in 1959.

==== Nile water agreement ====
Water scarcity is a critical concern in the Horn of Africa, where both Egypt and Sudan rely heavily on the Nile for survival. As a result, the allocation and management of the river’s waters have long been, and remain, a sensitive matter in relations between the two countries. The Nile flows through Sudan before reaching Egypt. An estimated 95% of all Egyptians depend on the Nile for fresh water. In 1959 the two countries concluded the Nile Waters Agreement, which was a formula for sharing the water, whereby Sudan was authorized to use approximately one quarter of the flow and Egypt about three quarters. The division was predicated on a set annual flow, which varied enormously from year to year. There was usually a surplus above this amount.

=== Relations during the Nimeiry era (1969-1985) ===
In 1969, a conspiracy of Sudanese officers led by Colonel Jaafar Nimeiry overthrew the Sudanese government. Nimeiry adopted a pro-Arab nationalist political position, including signing the Tripoli Charter with the UAR and Libya, a transnational union designed as a first step towards the eventual political unification of the three nations.

Egypt's president Nasser died in 1970 and was succeeded by Anwar Sadat. Nimeiry also signed treaties with Sadat, standing by him after Sadat's peace treaty with Israel in 1978.

In 1976, Egypt and Sudan concluded the 1976 Wadi El Nil bilateral agreement, which sought to strengthen bilateral connections between the two states. Under the agreement, citizens of Sudan and Egypt were permitted to enter each other’s territory without visas and were afforded extensive social and economic rights, including access to employment, education, healthcare, and property ownership.

That same year, Egypt and Sudan concluded a joint defense agreement in July 1976, under which each country committed to regard an armed attack on the other as a shared threat. The accord provided for mutual defense measures, including military force, as well as coordination through information sharing, consultation in emergencies, and cooperation in defense planning and military development.

Egypt's president Sadat was assassinated in 1981, and was succeeded by Hosni Mubarak. The next year, Egypt and Sudan concluded an integration charter establishing a ten year framework for close coordination in political, economic, and social affairs, reflecting Egypt’s priorities of safeguarding its Nile water interests and discouraging separatist movements in the region. The agreement raised concerns in southern Sudan that Egypt, despite opposing political Islam, might align with the northern government’s efforts to suppress the South.

In 1983, Nimeiry introduced Islamic law in Sudan, including severe criminal penalties and the prohibition of interest based financial practices. This eventually triggered the Second Sudanese Civil War, which ultimately resulted in an estimated two million deaths, displaced around four million people internally, and forced several hundred thousand others to flee the country. Because of the Wadi El Nil agreement, the new wave of Sudanese who fled to Egypt were not required to apply for refugee status.

=== Political rupture (1985–1999) ===
In April 1985, a military coup in Sudan overthrew Nimeiry. Mubarak visited Sudan later that year and stated that he would not surrender Nimeiry to Sudan. Nimeiry subsequently lived in exile in Egypt until 1999. In April 1989, Sudan’s prime minister Sadiq al Mahdi announced the cancellation of the joint defense agreement with Egypt, citing its conclusion under Jaafar Nimeiry, while the Egyptian government neither confirmed nor denied that the agreement had been terminated.

A civilian government was established in Sudan, but it was overthrown three years later by the 1989 military coup, and replaced by a totalitarian regime led by Omar al-Bashir.

Relations between the two countries following the 1989 Sudanese coup were unstable, and deteriorated sharply in June 1995, when an assassination attempt occurred as assailants opened fire on Egypt's president Hosni Mubarak’s convoy in Addis Ababa, while he was attending an Organization of African Unity summit. Egyptian authorities subsequently accused the Sudanese government of orchestrating the attack, alleging that senior officials within Sudan’s intelligence services reportedly viewed Egypt as a leading opponent of Sudan’s Islamist project and provided logistical and financial support to the Egyptian Islamist group, Gama'a Islamiyya, while acting independently of the country’s top political leadership. Sudanese officials denied state responsibility for the attack and called these claims "unjust and unsubstantiated" in a UN letter.

The incident ultimately led to three United Nations Security Council resolutions against the Sudanese government, citing its support for international terrorism, and to the annulment of the 1976 Wadi El Nil agreement. This cancellation marked a major shift in Egypt’s treatment of Sudanese nationals living in Egypt, who thereafter became subject to visa and residence requirements, increased security scrutiny, and standard asylum procedures applied to foreign nationals.

=== Normalization (1999-present) ===
By the end of 1999, Egyptian anger toward Sudan had subsided, and President al-Bashir visited Egypt, where the two leaders agreed to normalize diplomatic relations. Al-Bashir returned to Cairo in 2002, at which time they expanded cooperation on a variety of practical issues. Mubarak repaid the visit by going to Khartoum the following year. In 2004 al-Bashir again went to Cairo, where the two leaders signed the Four Freedoms Agreement dealing with freedom of ownership, movement, residence, and work between the two countries. There has been cooperation on counterterrorism and development projects drawing water from the Nile, and the two governments agreed to establish a free-trade zone along the Egypt–Sudan border, where they would exchange commodities free of duty. Sudan has particularly appreciated Egyptian verbal and moral support for its policy in Darfur. Egypt also sent troops to the United Nations–African Union Mission in Darfur. Egyptian investments in Sudan reached US$2.5 billion by 2008 while Sudanese investments in Egypt totaled almost US$200 million. By 2010 Egyptian–Sudanese relations were better than they had been in many years, although several long-term contentious issues, such as the future status of South Sudan, ownership of the Hala’ib Triangle, and use of Nile water, remained unresolved.

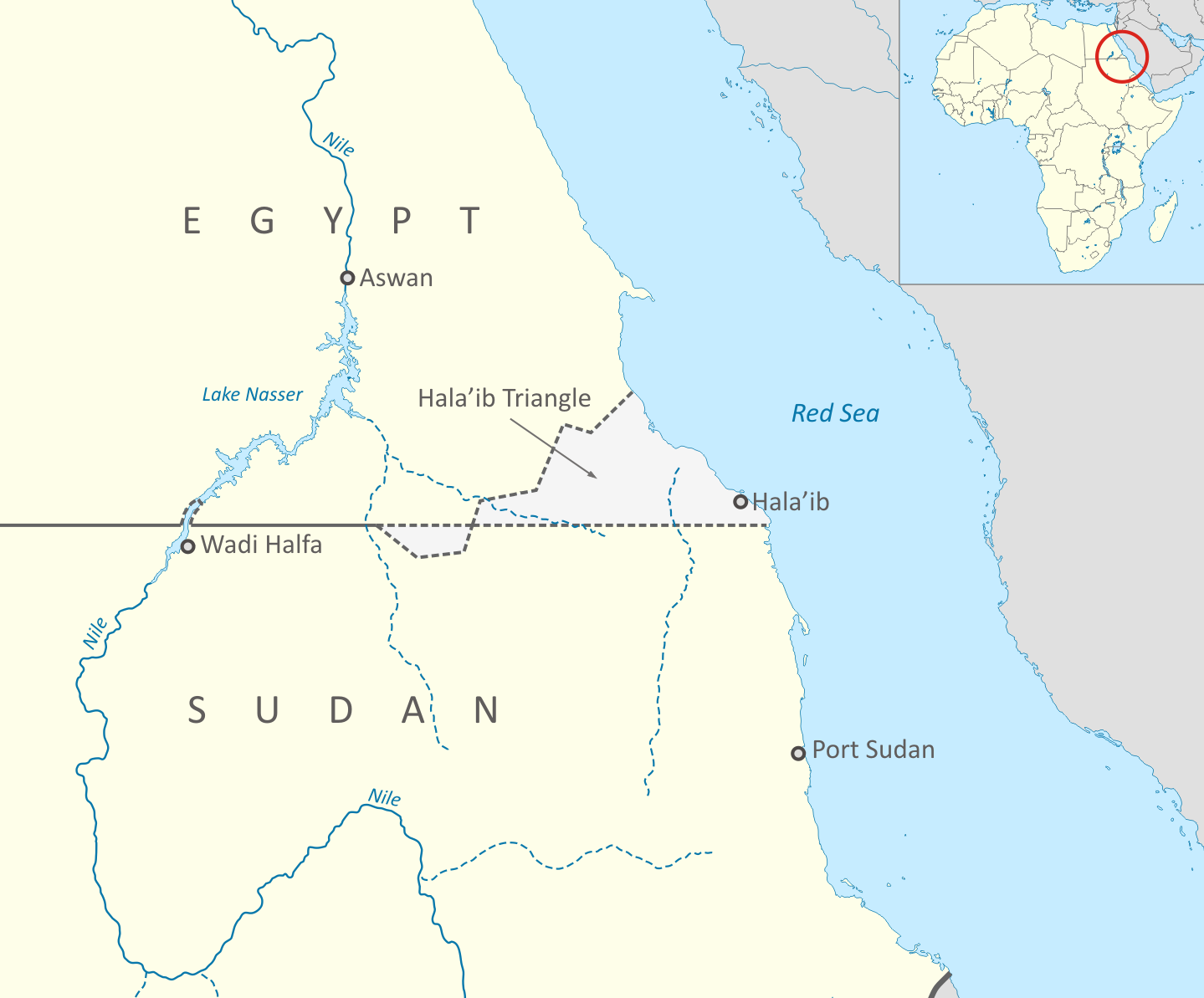
Map of the Hala'ib Triangle

==== Nile water politics ====
Under the 1959 Nile Waters Agreement, water allocations were based on a fixed annual flow, despite large year-to-year variations in the river’s volume. Because there was usually a surplus beyond the allocated amounts, the use of Nile water by other riparian states had not led to a crisis between Egypt and Sudan. From 2000 onward, Sudan had begun expressing an interest in changing the terms of the 1959 Nile Water Agreement so that it would be able to use a larger percentage of the flow. At the same time, seven of the eight other riparian states—Burundi, the Democratic Republic of the Congo, Ethiopia, Kenya, Rwanda, Tanzania, and Uganda—also pressed for a revised water allocation formula.

In 1999, the nine countries formed the Nile Basin Initiative as a discussion forum about cooperating in the development of the Nile Basin. In 2005, Egypt was concerned that the 2005 Comprehensive Peace Agreement between the government of Sudan and the Sudan People's Liberation Movement would lead to the emergence of South Sudan as a separate riparian state. Egypt had preferred a unified Sudan, as South Sudan would become an additional country with which it would need to negotiate Nile water rights.

In 2010 a sharp division emerged, with seven riparian states reaching their own agreement, while Egypt and Sudan opposed it. No agreement had been reached by 2011, mainly because Egypt and Sudan refused any reduction in their share of water.

==== Territorial disputes and South Sudan ====
While Egypt and Sudan generally agreed on the Nile water question, they had failed to resolve a longstanding dispute over the location of their border near the Red Sea, an area called the Hala'ib Triangle. Egypt occupied the disputed territory, but the matter remained ripe for future conflict. Al-Bashir revived the controversy in 2010 when he stated that Hala’ib was Sudanese and would stay Sudanese.

When the Second Sudanese Civil War ended, a peace agreement was signed that stipulated a referendum on the independence of South Sudan. Egypt's policy on Sudan was that it was in favour of a united Sudan. Egypt sought to postpone the referendum by four to six years, citing concerns that an independent southern state could become unstable and that Sudan’s partition might endanger Egypt’s access to Nile water.

Egypt nevertheless began preparing for the possible independence of South Sudan. In an effort to keep track of developments there, Egypt had about 1,500 military personnel assigned to the United Nations Mission in Sudan and had begun supporting a number of development projects in the South. It had a consulate in Juba, and Mubarak traveled there in 2008. Salva Kiir visited Cairo in 2009, when Egypt made clear it would accept the results of the January 2011 referendum on secession. In 2010, Egypt also offered a US$300 million grant for Southern water and electricity projects along the Nile.

==== Sudanese civil war (2023–present) ====
On 15 April 2023, a civil war broke out between Sudanese Armed Forces (SAF) and Rapid Support Forces (RSF). Egypt had chosen the side of the SAF by supplying soldiers and warplanes. Egyptian President Abdel Fattah el-Sisi had a close tie with Sudan's military leader Abdel Fattah al-Burhan. In early 2023, Egypt started a political initiative in Cairo to resolve SAF and RSF differences, but the initiative was in the favor of the SAF. As the fighting started Hemedti’s forces captured 27 Egyptian military men. The western officials tried to defuse the crisis, that would intensify the regional conflict.

By late 2025, reports indicated a growing Egyptian role in support of the Sudanese Armed Forces. According to Reuters, Egyptian security officials privately acknowledged providing logistical and technical assistance to the SAF, while satellite imagery showed Turkish-made Bayraktar Akıncı combat drones stationed at Egypt's East Oweinat airbase near the Sudanese border. Reuters reported that regional analysts and diplomats viewed the deployment as evidence of a shift from Egypt's earlier limited involvement toward a more direct role in the conflict.

== See also ==
- Sudanese refugees in Egypt
