= St. Andrew's United Church in Cairo =

Christian church in Egypt

Coordinates: 30.053583°N 31.238016°E

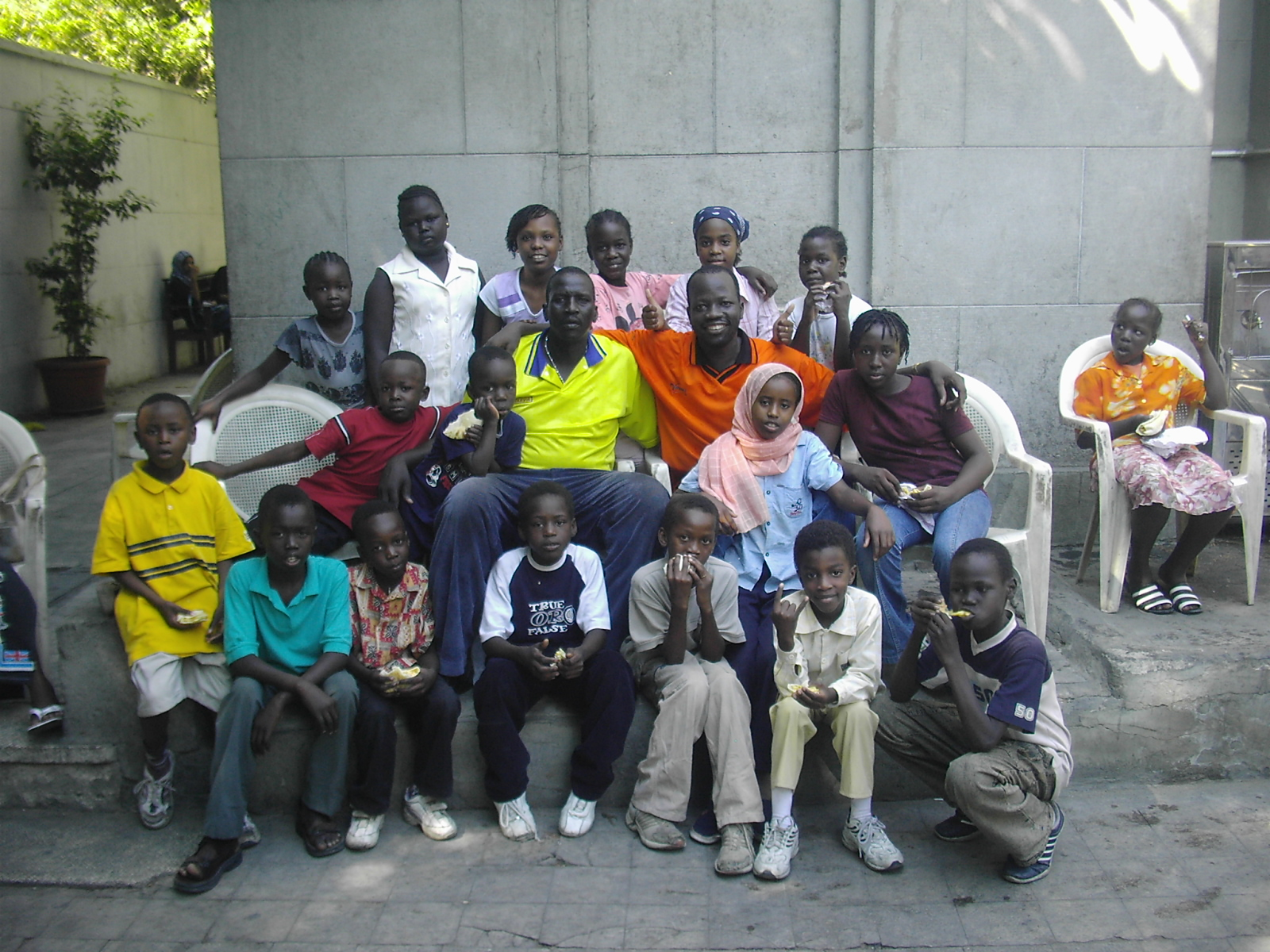
Group of students and teachers at St. Andrews in summer 2005

St. Andrew's United Church of Cairo is an international Christian church in Egypt. It has an English-speaking international congregation, an Egyptian congregation and five refugee congregations. Its church building was completed in 1908. It is located at 38 26 July St. between Ramses and Galaa streets, just above the Nasser metro stop in downtown Cairo. English worship services are held at 10 am on Fridays.

St. Andrew's also provides St. Andrew's Refugee Services. Since 1978, St. Andrew's congregation has played a role in educating and advocating among African refugees in Egypt. Most of the refugees fled their homes in Sudan, but some also come from as far away as Eritrea, Somalia and Iraq. The African refugee ministry began as part of the ongoing ministry of St. Andrew's United Church of Cairo. Now it is separately constituted and has its own board, though local members of St. Andrew's also volunteer with the Refugee Services. The refugees themselves are involved in the administration of the program whenever possible.

== See also ==
- Sudanese refugees in Egypt
- Coptic Orthodox Churches in Egypt
