= New Halfa Scheme =

Human settlement in Sudan

Coordinates: 15.2033°N 35.6139°E

The New Halfa Project (Arabic: حلفا الجديدة) in Sudan is a 164,000 feddan site constructed in 1964 to house 50,000 Nubians displaced from Wadi Halfa, a town situated on the Nile near the border with Egypt, which was flooded when Lake Nasser formed behind the Aswan Dam. The site draws its water from the Atbara River, where the Khashm el Girba Dam provides a reliable source for the irrigation project intended to convert the nomads of the area to farmers of cotton and sugar.

Amongst the problems faced by the settlers have been low crop yields, insufficient water for irrigation, low revenues, shortage of fuel, machinery and spare parts, and rising production costs.

The failed New Halfa Project has been largely viewed as inadequate compensation for the inundation of Wadi Halfa that occurred after the agreement with Egypt to allow construction of the Aswan Dam. The inhabitants of New Halfa have not managed to attain the same standard of living that they previously possessed in Wadi Halfa. The developmental benefits of the Aswan Dam have arguably been vested in Egypt and not Sudan, as manifested by the disappointing New Halfa Project and its impoverished inhabitants.
