= Wadi Halfa =

City in Northern state, Sudan

Wadi Halfa وادي حلفا
- City
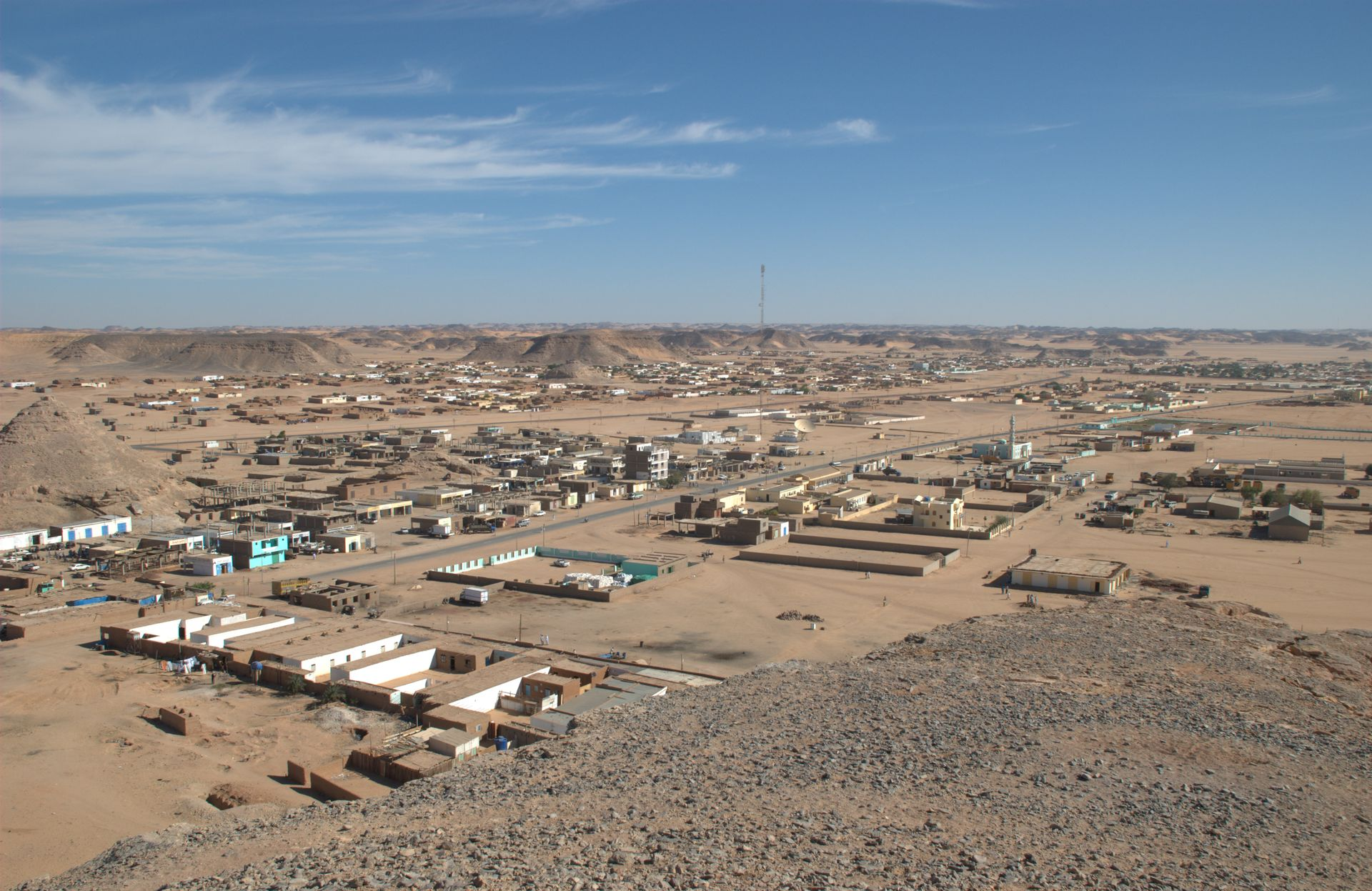

- Location in Sudan
- Coordinates: 21°47′N 31°22′E
- Country: Sudan
- State: Northern

Population (2007)
  - Total: 15,725

Wadi Halfa (Note: Formerly also romanized as Halfa and Wady Halfa.) (Arabic: وادي حلفا, romanized: Wādī Ḥalfā, Sudanese Arabic: [ˈwaːdi ˈħalfa], "Esparto Valley") is a city in the Northern State of Sudan on the shores of Lake Nubia near the border with Egypt. It is the terminus of a rail line from Khartoum and the point where goods are transferred from rail to ferries going down the lake. As of 2007, the city had a population of 15,725. The city is located amidst numerous ancient Nubian antiquities and was the focus of much archaeological work by teams seeking to save artifacts from the flooding caused by the completion of the Aswan Dam. The Wadi Halfa Sailent, a disputed territory between Egypt and Sudan, is located to its north.

== Climate ==
Wadi Halfa has a hot desert climate (Köppen climate classification BWh) typical of the Nubian Desert. Wadi Halfa receives each year the highest mean amount of bright sunshine, with an extreme value of 4,300 h, which is equal to 97–98 % of possible sunshine. In addition to this, the town receives a mean annual amount of rainfall of 0.5 millimetres or 0.020 inches. Many years usually pass without any rain falling on the ground.

Wadi Halfa experiences long, hot summers and short, warm winters. The annual mean temperature is about 27 °C or 80.6 °F. From May to September, inclusively, the average highs exceed 40 °C or 104 °F. The annual mean rate of potential evaporation is also among the highest found throughout the world, totalling as much as 5,930 millimetres or 230 inches.

Climate data for Wadi Halfa (1991–2020 normals, extremes 1961–2020)
Month	Jan	Feb	Mar	Apr	May	Jun	Jul	Aug	Sep	Oct	Nov	Dec	Year
Record high °C (°F)	37.0 (98.6)	41.6 (106.9)	45.5 (113.9)	47.0 (116.6)	49.5 (121.1)	48.7 (119.7)	47.5 (117.5)	47.6 (117.7)	46.5 (115.7)	45.0 (113.0)	39.0 (102.2)	36.0 (96.8)	49.5 (121.1)
Mean daily maximum °C (°F)	23.5 (74.3)	26.2 (79.2)	30.7 (87.3)	36.0 (96.8)	39.9 (103.8)	41.4 (106.5)	41.6 (106.9)	41.7 (107.1)	39.9 (103.8)	36.6 (97.9)	29.6 (85.3)	24.8 (76.6)	34.3 (93.7)
Daily mean °C (°F)	17.2 (63.0)	19.3 (66.7)	23.4 (74.1)	28.3 (82.9)	32.4 (90.3)	33.9 (93.0)	34.2 (93.6)	34.8 (94.6)	33.2 (91.8)	30.1 (86.2)	23.5 (74.3)	19.1 (66.4)	27.5 (81.5)
Mean daily minimum °C (°F)	10.9 (51.6)	12.4 (54.3)	16.1 (61.0)	20.6 (69.1)	24.9 (76.8)	26.5 (79.7)	26.8 (80.2)	27.9 (82.2)	26.5 (79.7)	23.5 (74.3)	17.4 (63.3)	13.4 (56.1)	20.6 (69.1)
Record low °C (°F)	3.5 (38.3)	2.5 (36.5)	6.0 (42.8)	10.5 (50.9)	13.4 (56.1)	15.5 (59.9)	18.5 (65.3)	17.8 (64.0)	17.4 (63.3)	12.3 (54.1)	5.2 (41.4)	2.0 (35.6)	2.0 (35.6)
Average precipitation mm (inches)	0 (0)	0 (0)	0 (0)	0 (0)	0 (0)	0 (0)	0.1 (0.00)	0.5 (0.02)	0 (0)	0 (0)	0 (0)	0 (0)	0.6 (0.02)
Average precipitation days (≥ 1.0 mm)	0	0	0	0	0	0	0	0.1	0	0	0	0	0.2
Average relative humidity (%)	42	36	28	23	21	22	24	24	26	30	39	45	30
Mean monthly sunshine hours	306.9	277.2	306.9	303.0	319.3	333.0	341.0	328.6	306.0	313.1	306.0	328.6	3,769.6
Source: NOAA

== History ==
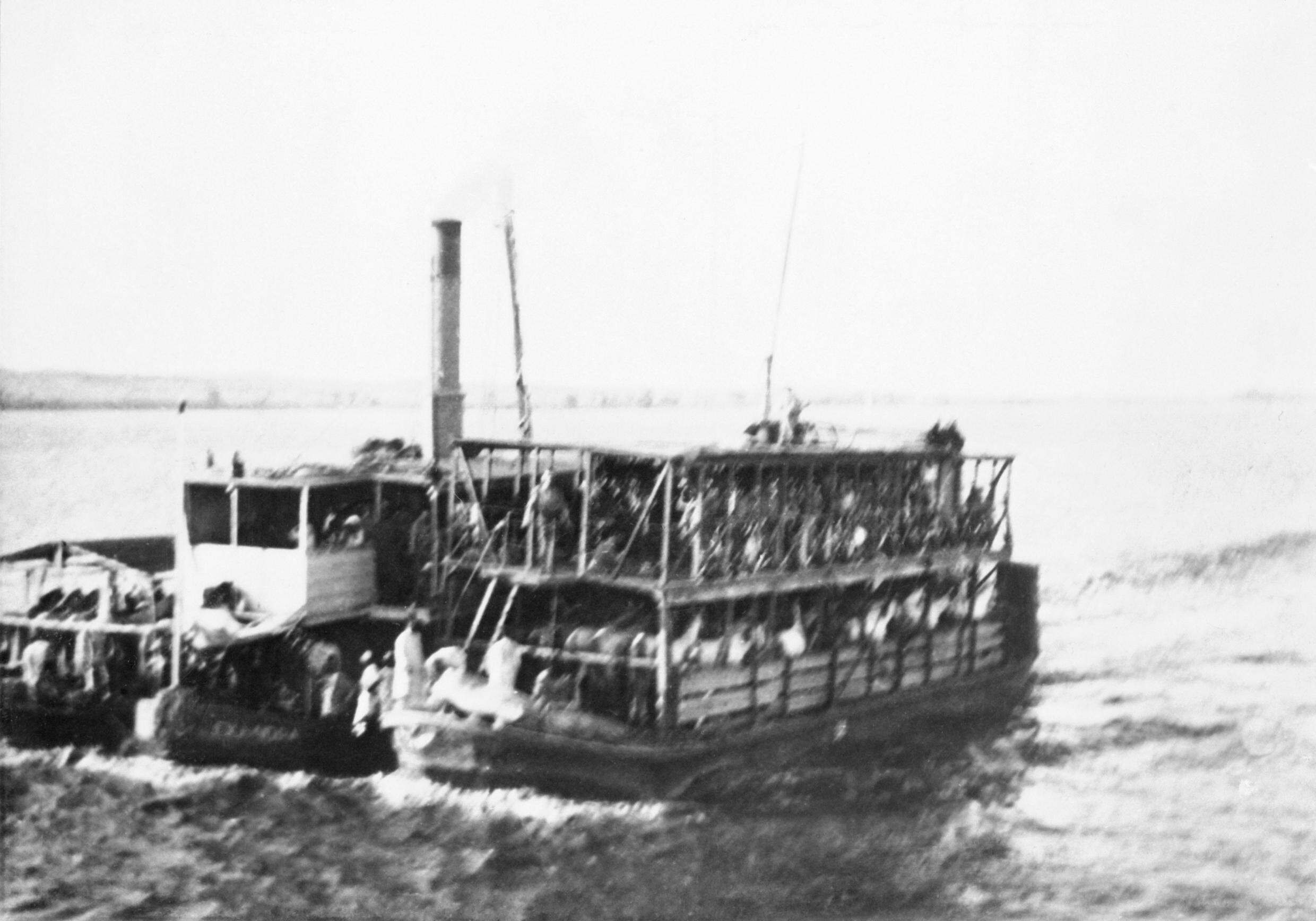
A 19th-century photograph of British troops aboard a steamer connecting Wadi Halfa with Asyut during the Mahdist War.

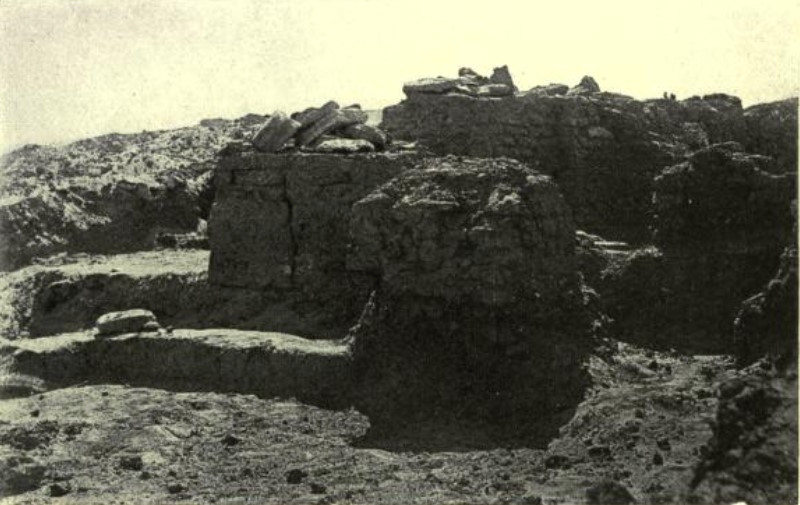
Photo from 1910 showing the ruins of a medieval Nubian church near Wadi Halfa

=== Ancient Period ===
Archaeological evidence indicates that settlements have existed in the area since ancient times, and during the Middle Kingdom period, the Egyptian colony of Buhen across the river existed until the Roman period. However, the area of the contemporary city itself was never truly occupied by the Roman Empire, and was just out of bounds of Roman jurisdiction.

=== Medieval Period ===
During the Medieval Ages the city became a gateway for pilgrims travelling to Mecca, and fell under the jurisdiction of the Christian Kingdom of Makuria.

=== Contemporary Period ===
The modern town of Wadi Halfa was founded in the 19th century, when it became a port on the Nile for steamers from Aswan, such as the Nubia. During the Turko-Egyptian conquest of 1820, Wadi Halfa was used as a stopping point for troops headed south. Communications developed in the latter half of the 19th century, with a telegraph line to Egypt connected in 1866 and ill-fated attempts to build a railway to Kerma in 1873 and 1877. The eventual establishment of the Sudanese rail head at Wadi Halfa—connected via steamer to the Egyptian network via a port just south of Asyut—caused the site to eclipse the former caravan site at Korosko.

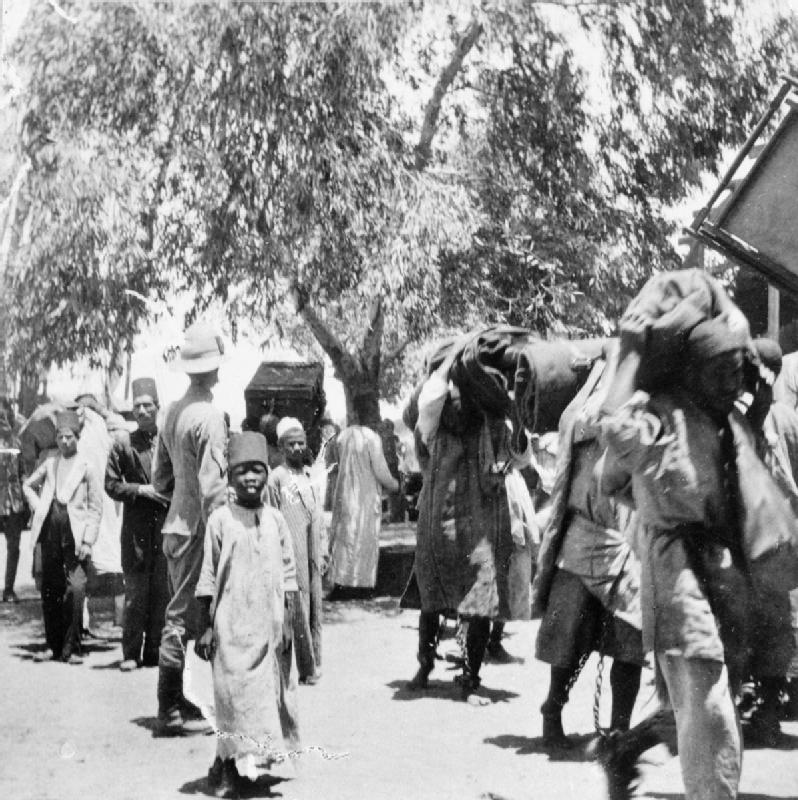
Chained Sudanese prisoners carrying British baggage through Wadi Halfa in 1898.

In 1885, Wadi Halfa entered a period of turmoil after falling under the Mahdist War regime. Conflicts frequently broke out on the border, and in 1889, Abd al-Rahman al-Mahdi's army entered the town on the way to the Battle of Tushki. Wadi Halfa was briefly the headquarters of the British-led Egyptian and British forces under Kitchener seeking to defeat the forces of Muhammad Ahmad, the Mahdi proclaimed by his disciples, from 1881 to 1885. The rail line up the Nile was originally begun in 1897 to support this military buildup. It extends, via Atbara, to El Obeid and beyond into southern and western Sudan.

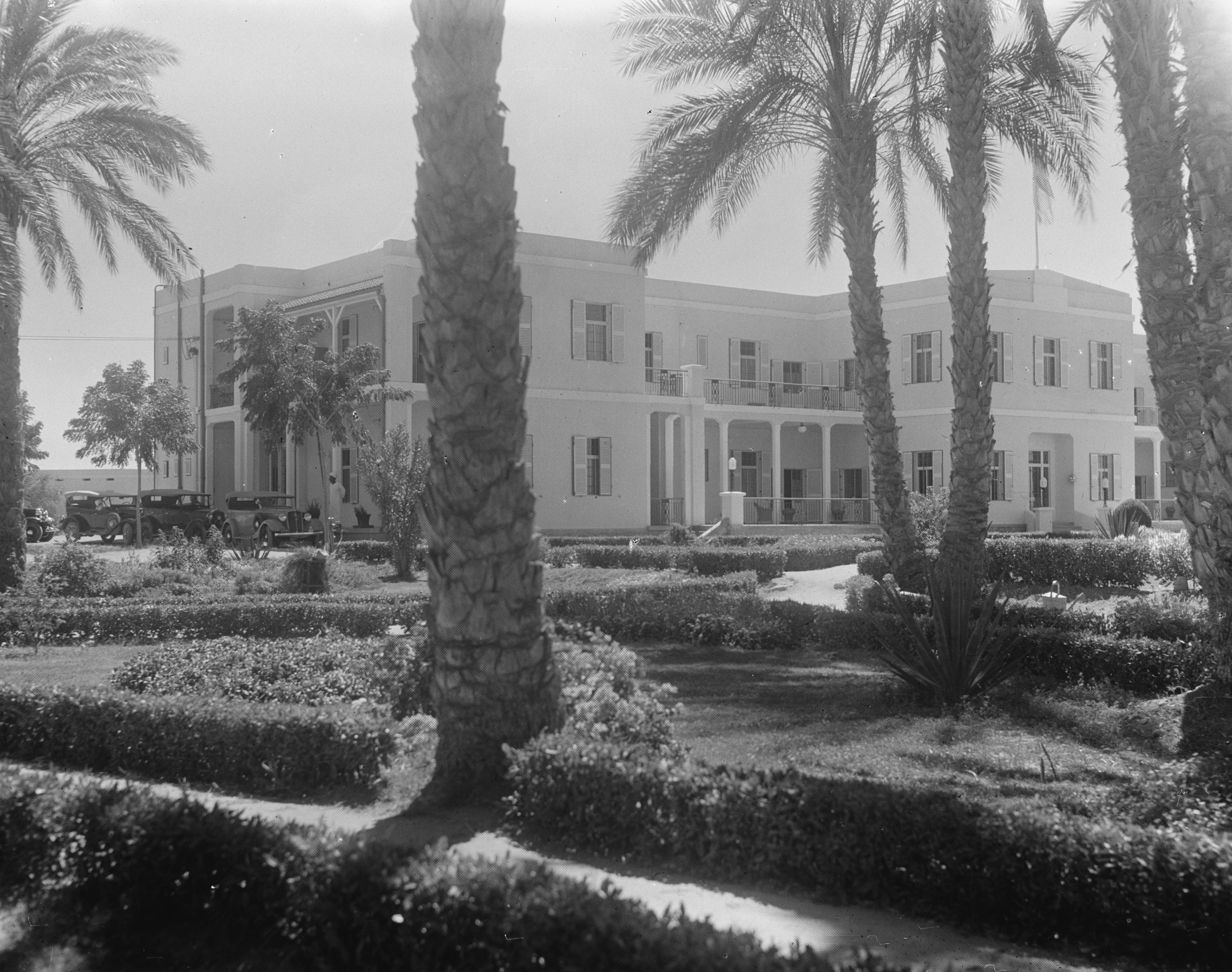
Wadi Halfa RR Hotel, 1936

A river monitoring station functioned in Wadi Halfa between 1911 and 1931, to monitor changes associated with the Aswan reservoir, but from 1931 to 1962 it was moved to Kajnarty, 47 kilometres to the north of the town. A railroad hotel was built in the town during the 20th century, and during World War II, Wadi Halfa was a communications post for Allied forces in Africa. By 1956, the town had grown to a population of 11,000. On 8 November 1959, the signing of the Sudanese-UAR Nile Water Agreement brought the area into much debate. This was because the agreement to flood the area upon the creation of the Aswan Dam would directly affect some 52,000 people in the area who would have to be resettled over a four-year period from 1960. Worst affected were the Nubians who demonstrated in Wadi Halfa on 23–24 October 1960 against being resettled. Subsequently, on 26 October demonstrations took place in the Sudanese capital, Khartoum, which had to be dispersed by police using tear gas. The government was quick to suppress the agitation, placing Wadi Halfa under martial law and terminating communications with the rest of the country. Protests in Khartoum, mainly by students, led to the temporary closure of the Khartoum campus of Cairo University and about 50 arrests. The old town was completely destroyed after the construction of the Aswan High Dam due to flooding in 1964. Most of the town was relocated, and by 1965 the population of New Halfa was just 3,200. During the 1970s, the area was under intense scrutiny by archaeologists working to protect ancient Nubian monuments.

Wadi Halfa was featured in part four, entitled "Shifting Sands", of the eight part Michael Palin television documentary series Pole to Pole released by the BBC in 1992.

In 2005, a museum and interactive Nubian village were planned for Wadi Halfa, but by 2014 nothing had been done.

== Economy ==
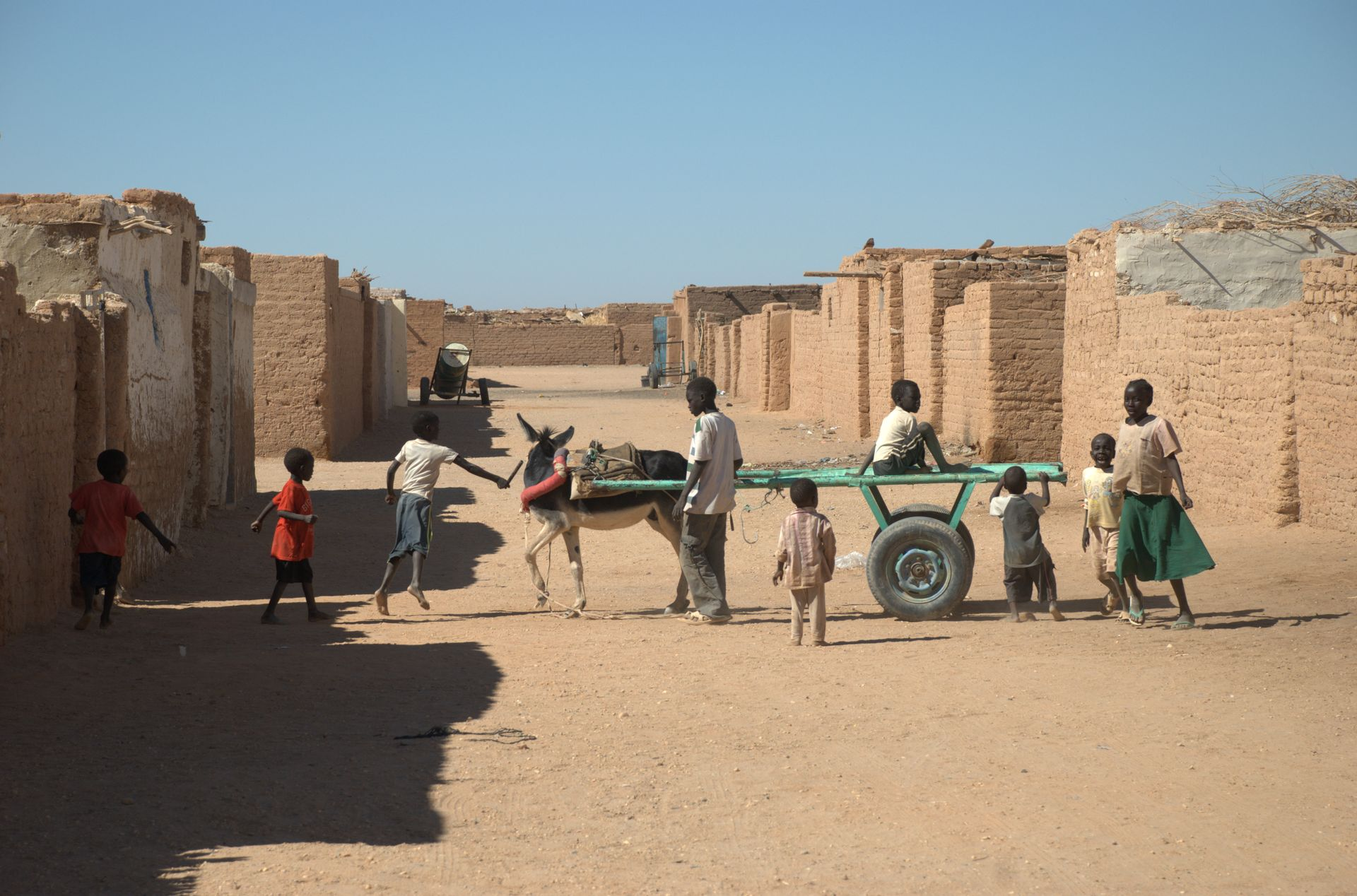
Living quarter for South Sudanese people.

Agriculture plays an important role in local economy. The Chinese have invested in a fish processing plant in the town.

== Transport ==
The trans-African automobile route — the Cairo-Cape Town Highway passes through Wadi Halfa.

In 2012 agreement was achieved between Sudan and Egypt to complete a Standard gauge link between Aswan and Wadi Halfa, however progress was stalled by civil unrest and the beginning of the Sudanese Civil War in 2023.
