= Gabal Hagar El Zarqa =

Mountain in Bir Tawil

- Location within Egypt

Highest point
- Elevation: 662 m (2,172 ft)
- Coordinates: 21°53′00.7″N 33°58′12.8″E

Gabal Hagar El Zarqa (Arabic: جَـبَـل حَـجَـر الـزَّرْقَـاء, romanized: Jabal Ḥajar az-Zarqā’) is the highest point in Bir Tawil, an unclaimed area in the Nubian desert between Egypt and Sudan in Northeast Africa. Due to a long-standing disagreement over the location of that border, its jurisdiction is unclear; it is said by the National Geospatial-Intelligence Agency to be in Egypt. In December 2017, British mountaineer Ginge Fullen accompanied by a local guide summited a point 400 m (1,300 ft) to the east of the waypoint listed on the right, recording a height of 716 m (2,349 ft) at N21 53'01 E33 58'13.

== See also ==
- Al Hajar Mountains
- North Africa
- Wildlife of Egypt
- Wildlife of Sudan
