= Sudanese refugees in Egypt =

Sudanese in Egypt
- (Sudan) (Egypt)
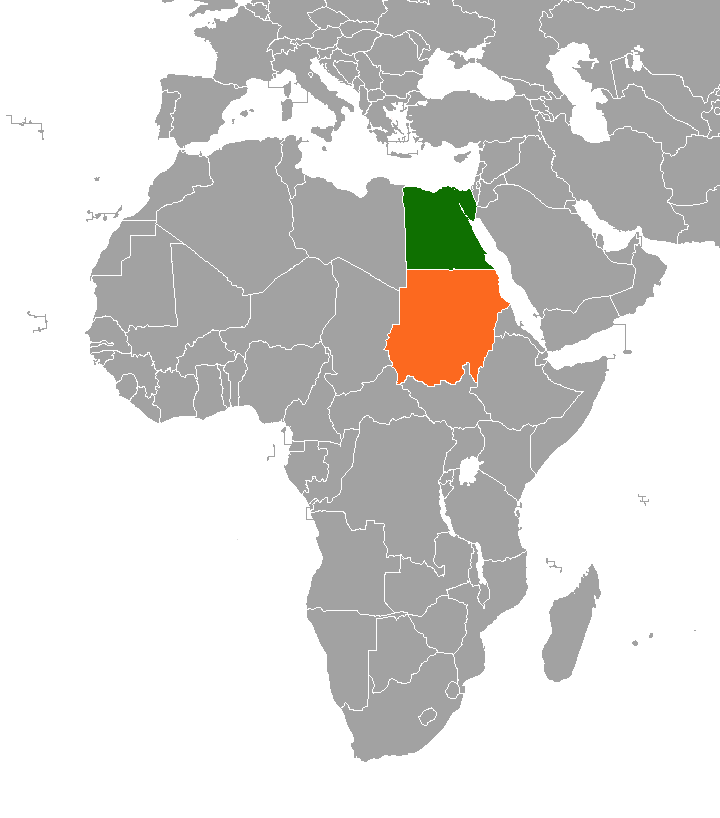

Total population
- 4,000,000

Regions with significant populations
- Southern Egypt, Cairo, Alexandria, Suez, Sharm el Sheikh

Languages
- Sudanese Arabic

Religion
- Sunni Islam

Related ethnic groups
- Sudanese Arabs, Beja, Nubians, Fur

Refugees from Sudan have long sought safety in Egypt because of armed conflict, political instability, and humanitarian crises in Sudan. Egypt has been a major destination for displaced Sudanese owing to the two countries' geographic proximity, historical ties, and earlier bilateral agreements that once allowed broad freedom of movement and residence.

Sudanese migration to Egypt dates back to the colonial period and increased during the First and Second Sudanese civil wars. For decades, Sudanese in Egypt occupied an ambiguous position shaped by shifting bilateral arrangements and uneven refugee recognition. After earlier special entry and residence privileges were revoked in the 1990s, many Sudanese became subject to ordinary immigration and asylum procedures and were left in legal limbo. Although Egypt is a signatory to major refugee conventions, access to legal protection and stable residency has often remained uncertain.

Since the outbreak of the Sudanese conflict in April 2023, Egypt has received the largest share of those fleeing the conflict, with more than 1.2 million arrivals reported by November 2024. At the same time, conditions for Sudanese refugees in Egypt have become more restrictive, including tighter border controls, arrests and deportations of undocumented migrants, reduced freedom of movement, and a new asylum law that drew criticism from rights groups. Sudanese refugees have also faced discrimination and practical difficulties in securing housing, work, schooling, medical care, and personal safety.

Refugees in Egypt live alongside a much larger Sudanese migrant population. In 2022, about 4 million Sudanese nationals were living in the country.

== Background ==
=== Egypt ===
From the early 1900s onward, Egypt hosted multiple waves of refugees and migrants. Armenians sought refuge there following the mass violence of 1915 under Ottoman rule, while large numbers of Palestinians arrived after the 1948 Nakba and again following Black September in Jordan in 1971.

By August 2022, Sudanese migrants were the largest migrant group in Egypt, with an estimated 4 million living in the country. This was before a further influx of 1.2 million refugees following the outbreak of the Sudanese conflict in 2023.

=== Sudan ===
During the nineteenth century, Sudan was regarded as part of Egypt, with both territories administered jointly under British colonial rule. Between 1899 and 1956, the Anglo-Egyptian Sudan was a condominium of the United Kingdom and Egypt, corresponding to the territory of what is now both Sudans and parts of southeastern Libya. In the decades that followed, repeated internal conflicts in Sudan contributed to severe economic decline and the breakdown of infrastructure, prompting large scale outward migration. Millions of Sudanese left the country, both to seek protection from violence and to pursue livelihoods elsewhere, with Egypt emerging as a primary destination.

== History ==
=== Early migration ===
Sudanese migration to Egypt has a long history, driven by the search for safety as well as economic opportunities. Sudanese refugees began arriving in Egypt after the outbreak of the First Sudanese Civil War in 1955, in the period immediately preceding the country’s independence. The conflict, which continued for almost twenty years, caused the deaths of around half a million people and displaced hundreds of thousands from their homes. Egypt served as an appealing place of refuge for many of these displaced people, owing both to the close historical ties between the two countries and to Egypt’s fairly well developed economy and education system. Egypt also served as a place of refuge for Sudanese political activists. During the period leading up to the October Revolution of 1964, some Sudanese opponents of military rule operated from Cairo, where they found support and protection.

=== Wadi El Nil agreement (1976-1995) ===
In 1976, Egypt and Sudan concluded the 1976 Wadi El Nil bilateral agreement, which sought to strengthen bilateral connections between the two states. Under the agreement, citizens of Sudan and Egypt were permitted to enter each other’s territory without visas and were afforded extensive social and economic rights, including access to employment, education, healthcare, and property ownership. When a new wave of Sudanese fled to Egypt in 1983, following the imposition of Islamic law in Sudan and the outbreak of the Second Sudanese Civil War, they were therefore not required to apply for refugee status. By 2001, this war had caused the death of at least one in five southern Sudanese, and more than 4 million civilians in the South had been given internally displaced persons status. More than 80% of the population of southern Sudan had been displaced at least once, since the start of the war, often on multiple occasions. In addition, close to 500,000 people from southern Sudan fled the country and became refugees abroad.

From the early 1990s onward, continued wars and instability in the Horn of Africa brought large numbers of Sudanese refugees to Egypt, alongside refugees from other countries. As arrivals increased, the UNHCR office in Cairo shifted its focus away from education and training toward the care and maintenance of refugees. The arrival of large numbers of refugees from southern Sudan in the mid-1990s altered the composition of the Sudanese population in Egypt. Many of these newcomers were Christian and did not speak Arabic, which complicated interaction with Egypt’s largely Muslim and Arab-speaking society. Because of the conflict in Sudan, relations between southern Sudanese arrivals and the established northern Sudanese community in Egypt were often marked by mutual distrust, with northern Sudanese expressing concern that the influx of poorer and culturally different migrants would weaken their own standing.

=== Policy reversal after 1995 ===
In June 1995, following an assassination attempt on Egypt's president Hosni Mubarak which Egyptian authorities alleged involved the Sudanese government, the 1976 Wadi El Nil agreement was annulled. Its cancellation significantly altered the position of Sudanese nationals in Egypt. Those arriving after that point were required to obtain visas and residence permits, while Sudanese already living in the country faced heightened security scrutiny. Sudanese citizens were thereafter treated as foreign nationals, and Sudanese asylum seekers and refugees were subject to the same asylum procedures as applicants from other countries.

From the late 1990s, relatively few Sudanese migrants in Egypt obtained refugee status, largely because UNHCR applied a restrictive interpretation of the 1951 Refugee Convention that excluded applicants unable to demonstrate a well founded fear of persecution. Between 1997 and 2004, only about 20,700 out of roughly 67,000 Sudanese applicants were granted refugee status, and fewer than 15,000 were eventually resettled. Even those recognized as refugees often faced prolonged waits for resettlement and limited access to rights and services, while unrecognized migrants remained vulnerable to detention, deportation, and abuse.

=== Four Freedoms Agreement (2004) ===
In 2004, the two countries concluded the Four Freedoms Agreement with the aim of reinforcing bilateral ties. The agreement granted their citizens reciprocal rights to movement, residence, employment, and property ownership within the territory of the other country. The agreement was seen as a partial return to the Wadi El Nil Treaty, but it failed to secure access to essential services such as health care, schooling, or lawful employment, and it was never fully approved by Egyptian authorities. Consequently, large numbers of Sudanese migrants were left in a legal limbo, lacking formal refugee recognition and deprived of fundamental rights. The benefits of the agreement were largely limited to Sudanese citizens rather than Sudanese asylum seekers.

That same year, following the ceasefire in Sudan, UNHCR stopped granting refugee status to Sudanese nationals in Egypt. This decision triggered a prolonged sit in by Sudanese migrants outside the UNHCR office in Cairo, which ended in December 2005 when security forces violently dispersed the protest, resulting in the deaths of dozens of Sudanese migrants.

In the years following these events, many Sudanese migrants in Egypt experienced rising levels of discrimination and xenophobia, alongside continued restrictions on access to employment, social services, and legal protection. Reports also documented incidents of violence, arbitrary arrest, detention, and harassment, particularly during periods of strained relations between Egypt and Sudan, with forced migrants from Sudan facing heightened insecurity. Faced with these conditions, Sudanese refugees were often left with limited and dangerous options: returning to Sudan despite the risk of arrest or persecution, remaining in Egypt without legal recognition while awaiting possible protection, or attempting onward migration.

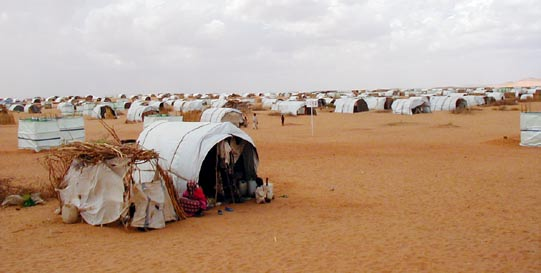
An IDP camp in Darfur.

In 2007, Sudan had the largest internally displaced population in the world. Displacement was driven by armed conflict, particularly in Darfur. Ongoing insecurity restricted humanitarian access, further limiting the delivery of food aid and essential services, and leaving up to one million internally displaced people in Darfur beyond the reach of urgent assistance. Sudan's capital Khartoum itself hosted a displaced population of about 2 million people. That year, an estimated 100,000 Sudanese refugees lived in Egypt.

Following the 2011 Libyan civil war, Egypt received an influx of people fleeing Libya, including Sudanese refugees. By May 2012, 1,652 Sudanese from Libya were recorded by UNHCR, many of whom were accommodated in temporary camps in the border area between Egypt and Libya.

A 2014 article noted that estimates of the total Sudanese population in Egypt varied widely, with Egyptian authorities often putting the figure at between 2 million and 5 million. It added that more than 60% were refugees who had arrived since the late 1980s.

=== 2023 Sudanese civil war ===
On 15 April 2023, war broke out between Sudanese Armed Forces and Rapid Support Forces. The conflict has caused a humanitarian crisis with widespread insecurity, assaults on civilians and civilian facilities, obstruction of humanitarian assistance, extensive sexual violence, and killings targeting specific ethnic groups. Other drivers of displacement are hunger and disease.

Since the outbreak of the war, most Sudanese refugees have fled to neighbouring countries, with Egypt receiving the largest share. Egypt has been a preferred destination due to its geographic proximity, relatively stronger economy, and the absence of formal refugee camps. Cultural, linguistic, and religious affinities, including the shared use of Arabic and a predominantly Sunni Muslim population in both countries, have contributed to a sense of familiarity. Existing Sudanese communities, lower living costs compared with Gulf states, and the ability to remain close to Sudan have further reinforced Egypt’s appeal, particularly for refugees who view their displacement as temporary. However, since 2023, Egypt’s refugee practice and legal framework became increasingly restrictive.

By November 2024, within 19 months of conflict, Egypt had received over 1.2 million Sudanese refugees, with slightly more than 600,000 registered with UNHCR. Women and children accounted for nearly three quarters of this population. However, local and international nongovernmental organizations have suggested that the actual number of Sudanese refugees in Egypt is considerably higher.

== Legal status and conflicts ==
Although Egypt is a founding signatory to both the 1951 Refugee Convention and the 1969 OAU Refugee Convention, the Egyptian government's lack of implementation and numerous conditions entered into the 1951 Convention substantially limit the rights of refugees in Egypt.

Throughout history, large numbers of Sudanese have lived in Egypt for long periods of time, often going back and forth between Egypt and Sudan. Since the start of the Second Sudanese Civil War in 1983 in southern Sudan, followed by the 1989 coup, Egypt has become the preferred place of refuge for Sudanese. Before 1995, the Wadi El Nil agreement between Sudan and Egypt gave Sudanese unrestricted access to education, health services, property ownership, and employment. However, with the assassination attempt on former President Mubarak in Addis Ababa in June 1995, allegedly performed by Sudanese Islamists, the Wadi El Nil agreement was abrogated, putting the rights of the Sudanese on par with any other foreigner.

Because of the Egyptian government's unwillingness to implement the appropriate procedures for refugee status determination due to institutional, financial, as well as political reasons, the UNHCR began screening Sudanese applications for refugee status in 1995. Due to Egypt's high unemployment rate and overall weak economic conditions, domestic popular opinion is generally against permitting rights to Sudanese refugees (education, employment, property, etc.) because of the potential strain on the country's resources and infrastructure. As for the perspective from Egypt's national interests, to offer official refugee status to the Sudanese would indirectly censure the Sudanese government. Additionally, unlike Sudanese refugees, Palestinian refugees are not treated as typical asylum seekers that require a status determination process because of the sentiment of Arab solidarity with the Palestinian cause.

From the late 1990s, the increasing numbers of Sudanese refugees and insufficient living conditions of Egypt lead to greater focus on resettlement to third countries, usually Australia, Canada, the U.S. or Finland. Out of the 67,000 Sudanese who claimed refugee status from the UNHCR office between 1997 and March 2004, only about 20,700 were recognized, reflecting a very limited interpretation of the refugee definition outlined in the 1951 Refugee Convention. Although most of the Sudanese in Egypt fled due to war and violence, many were rejected refugee status because they were unable to prove a "well-founded fear of persecution".

Of those recognized, UNHCR resettled more than 14,300 people. Private sponsorship's in addition to family reunification programs administered by the Australian and Canadian embassies have resettled an additional few thousand more. Since 2003, the percentage of Sudanese granted refugee status climbed substantially to about 60–63% as a result of UNHCR's expanded interpretation of the refugee definition in accordance with the OAU Convention.

The lack of refugee status and illegality results in the lack of employment access, education for children, health services, freedom of movement, and inability to claim justice. As a recognized refugee, an individual receives international protection guaranteed by the host government and UNHCR mainly in the form of protection against expulsion and arrest:

Being able to acquire a residence permit and being immune from the risk of deportation and arrest are considered by the Sudanese refugees in Egypt to be the core benefits of the blue card (the refugee document issued by UNHCR). However, refugee status in Egypt guarantees only limited access to rights due to reservations made by the Egyptian government to the 1951 Convention

— Grabska, Katarzyna in Marginalization in Urban Spaces of the Global South: Urban Refugees in Cairo

In January 2004, Egyptian politicians wrote legislation for a "Four Freedoms Agreement", which would grant both Sudanese and Egyptians the freedom of movement, residence, ownership and work in either country. It would allow Sudanese nationals to enter Egypt without a visa to live indefinitely in Egypt without any special permits and no longer have to seek refugee status to remain in the country. The agreement would not enable Sudanese refugees to benefit from educational, medical, or social benefits entitled to native citizens. However, as of 2009, the agreement was yet to be ratified by the Egyptian government.

In a 2010 survey among 22 Sudanese refugees who have fled to Egypt, more than half of them (14) reported that they felt "extremely" let down by the UNHCR.

With regards to Egyptian citizenship, refugees are barred from acquiring it as Egyptian nationality is granted only on the basis of descent, or Jus sanguinis. This precludes the full integration of refugees in Egypt even for children of refugees born in Egypt. There are few cases where naturalization is approved, such as if the individual is a long-term resident or their father was born in Egypt; but these laws are vague and citizenship is not necessarily guaranteed.

=== Changes since the 2023 Sudanese conflict ===
Shortly after fighting erupted in Sudan in 2023, Egypt suspended key provisions of the Four Freedoms agreement, significantly restricting the ability of Sudanese refugees to enter and remain in the country lawfully. The suspension also curtailed several rights that had previously been guaranteed.

By June 2024, reports indicated that from September 2023, Egyptian authorities had undertaken large scale arrests of Sudanese refugees on the grounds of irregular entry or residence. Detainees were reportedly held for days or weeks in harsh conditions and deported to Sudan without individual risk assessments or access to asylum procedures. At the same time, tens of thousands of undocumented Sudanese nationals remained vulnerable to detention and forced return based solely on their migration status.

In December 2024, Egypt enacted Law No. 164 of 2024, its first comprehensive asylum law since acceding to the 1951 Refugee Convention. The government stated that the law aimed to clarify refugees’ rights and responsibilities and to align national practice with international standards. The law transferred key asylum functions from UNHCR to a newly established Standing Committee for Refugees’ Affairs, composed of multiple government ministries, with authority over registration, status determination, resettlement, and deportation decisions.

Human rights organizations and legal experts, including several United Nations special mandate holders, warned that the law’s vague provisions could undermine refugee protections and increase deportations. Critics also raised concerns about the criminalization of irregular entry and informal assistance to asylum seekers, measures that could expose large numbers of Sudanese refugees and those supporting them to prosecution. While the law enumerated rights for recognized refugees, it did not clearly extend equivalent protections to asylum seekers, a gap highlighted as especially problematic given the large backlog of pending cases and the continuing arrival of Sudanese nationals.

== Conditions in Egypt ==
Refugees in Egypt experience discrimination by both the government and civilian services. A series of laws passed by parliament has effectively stalled legal and financial gains for refugees of all nationalities, and the response by the international community has been limited.

=== Employment ===
Legal employment in Egypt is "virtually" impossible for Sudanese refugees. Refugees' right to work is determined by Egypt's domestic legislation dealing with the employment of foreigners, law no.137 of 1981, which decrees that refugees must apply for a work permit on par with any other foreigner. Article 53 in the Egyptian Constitution gives the right of asylum to political refugees, however, only the few most prominent have been able to take advantage of this right like the Shah of Iran, Gaafar Nimeiry of Sudan, and the wife of the last king of Libya.

The 2003 Labor Law and its implementing Ministerial Decree and the 2004 Decree of the Ministry of Manpower and Emigration force all foreigners including refugees to have a permit to work in "gainful" employment. The requirements are reportedly very "stringent", and include assessments of legal status, employer sponsorship, and non-competition with nationals. In 2006, employers have since been required to submit a certificate verifying Sudanese nationals are not carrying AIDS. As a result of these requirements, only a fraction of Sudanese have obtained working permits. For Sudanese, the cost of a work permit is about ج.س. 24,060 Sudanese Pounds (US$40); however, they must prove they are uniquely qualified in order to get a work permit.

The lack of access to work permits has driven many Sudanese into the informal economy, where employment is scarce and often characterized by precarious or exploitative conditions.

=== Housing ===
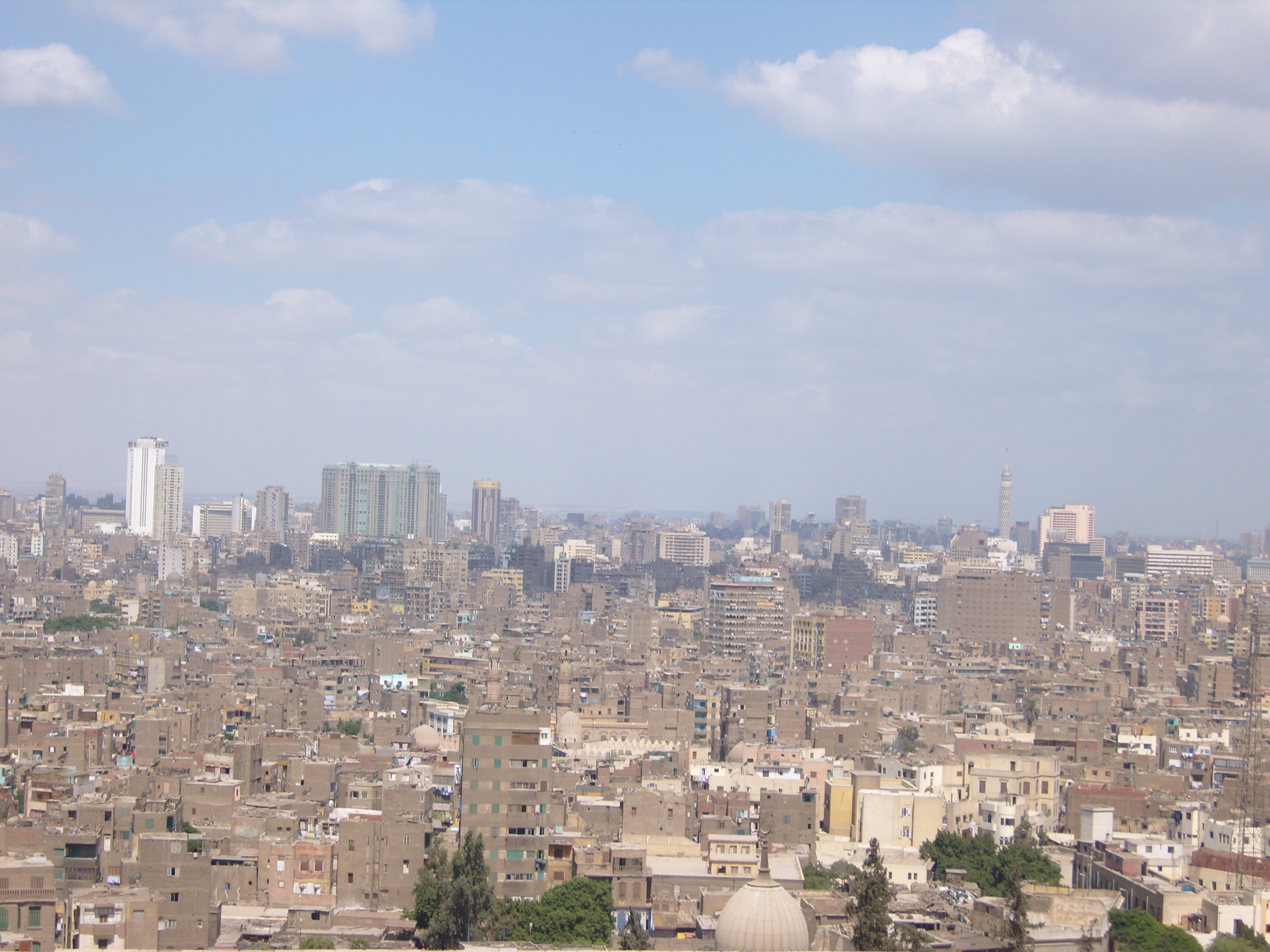
Cairo, Egypt

Egypt does not follow a policy of encampment, and refugees generally live among the local population. The large influx of Sudanese refugees in Egypt beginning in the late 1990s led to an increase in rent prices and a higher cost of living for refugees as well as social tensions between the natives and Sudanese not experienced during the past influxes in the 1980s. The increased rent prices burdened the Sudanese refugees particularly because they must pay for more expensive furnished flats, unlike natives who had the right to own property.

Many refugees unable to afford the rent prices in Cairo live in the dismal conditions of Cairo's destitute neighborhoods or in impoverished areas on the outskirts of the city. Refugee families also tend to share apartments to defray the cost of rent but the overcrowding and frequent visits of family members, which is common in Sudanese culture, has sometimes led to tension between Sudanese tenants and their Egyptian landlords. Moreover, single women and mothers tend to face discrimination when seeking housing since many Egyptian landlords prefer renting to two-parent households due to social stigma.

Housing costs in urban Egypt, particularly in Cairo, had already risen sharply before the war began in April 2023, with average rents increasing by around 30% over the previous year. Since then, rents have continued to climb, disproportionately affecting Sudanese refugees, with reports of sharp increases in areas near UNHCR offices and concerns about exploitative pricing amid widespread economic hardship.

Egypt has one refugee camp, the Al-Salloum refugee camp, situated in the desert area between the Libyan border and Egypt’s Al Salloum border post. In 2012, camp residents were unable to legally enter Egypt and were reluctant to return to Libya because of fears of racial discrimination.

=== Healthcare ===
Access to health care has become a pressing concern for Sudanese refugees in Egypt. Although Egyptian law and UNHCR formally provide refugees and asylum seekers with access to public health services on the same basis as Egyptian citizens, these provisions have often not been implemented in practice. From July 2024, a new government decree further restricted access by requiring refugees to present a valid residency permit in order to use public services. As many Sudanese refugees no longer hold valid permits and cannot renew them until at least 2027, large numbers have been effectively excluded from public health care.

Refugees have reported being denied treatment at public hospitals or facing costs beyond their means, regardless of their residency status. In response, refugees have relied on informal and community based forms of medical assistance, including unofficial online care provided by Sudanese doctors and the sharing of information about health facilities willing to treat refugees. Despite these efforts, access remains extremely limited, and volunteer doctors working with Sudanese communities have reported widespread gaps in treatment for chronic and serious conditions, including anemia, diabetes, and breast cancer.

Access to sexual and reproductive health care remains particularly limited for Sudanese women in Egypt. Many require regular services, including treatment related to sexual and gender based violence and mental health and psychosocial support, but are unable to obtain care because of cost and lack of availability. As a result, essential physical and psychological health needs often go untreated.

=== Education ===
Sudanese refugees endure a number of social, economic and political challenges in accessing education. The most acutely affected are those not recognized as refugees. Yet even for those registered with UNHCR, exercising their right to education is often impossible. A 2001 UNHCR case study highlighted concerns that UNHCR funding allocated for education was too low. Rather than being "geared towards subsidising the status quo", the author advised that it should be "geared towards fostering refugees' capacity to run their own lives".

The report also called for all children to have access to public primary schools, as well as providing support and assistance obtaining secondary and post-secondary education through scholarships for students and grants to churches with learning centers. Special attention was to be paid to integrating those children who had been out of education for several years. But this seems to have yielded little results because there was no modality put in place to follow up with the project. 75% of the Sudanese youth have no access to basic education; this is likely the root cause of the recent rise in gangsterism of Sudanese youths in Cairo. Almost ten years later in 2010, the UNHCR provided 7,000 education grants for registered refugees in Egypt—a relatively low number considering Egypt's burgeoning refugee population, of which the majority is Sudanese.

==== Legal framework ====
Egypt is party to a number of international conventions, including the 1951 Convention Relating to the Status of Refugees, the 1967 Casablanca Protocol (signed in 1981), and the 1989 UN Convention on the Rights of the Child. Egypt acceded to the 1951 Convention in 1981 with a number of reservations. There are also bilateral agreements between the Egyptian and Sudanese governments, including the 1974 Nile Valley Agreement and the 2004 Four Freedoms Agreement, permitting free movement of goods and people across the border.

These commitments on paper have failed to translate into affording refugees sufficient protection or access to rights, including education. Until recently, one of the reservations to the 1951 Convention referred to Article (22), which stipulated that refugees should receive the same treatment as nationals in accessing primary education. In 1992, and in December 2000, the government passed a decree permitting recognized refugee children to enter public primary schools. In 2003, the reality is that bureaucratic and social obstacles, ignorance and confusion over ministerial decrees deny Sudanese refugee and non-refugee children alike of their right to access education. In 2007, 60-70% of Sudanese asylum seekers had their applications for refugee status rejected. The Sudanese refugees in Egypt fall under two categories: those who were waiting for their status-determination interview and those who had been rejected or who were self-settled.

The role and procedures used by the UNHCR in determining the status of refugees in Egypt has been the source of occasional criticism from lawyers and refugee rights activists, notably Barbara Harrell-Bond and Michael Kagan.

==== Public schools ====
The Egyptian population has a 83.24% literacy rate, which is an indication of its overburdened and inadequate education system. In the past, it suffered criticism for its emphasis on memorization and an inadequate national curriculum. Schools suffer from overcrowding, which makes finding a place in the appropriate grade in public schools difficult for both Egyptian and Sudanese children. Some schools operate shift systems in order to accommodate a surplus of students, but in many schools the student-teacher ratio is 45 to 1, with even higher ratios in some inner-city schools.

Although Sudanese children were granted the right to free primary education in 2000, the cumbersome entry process for Sudanese children hinders access to public schools. The Egyptian Ministry of Education requires that Sudanese provide documentation from previous schools, a birth certificate and residency permit or iqama. Residency permits are often too expensive for Sudanese families, and having spent their lives as IDPs in Sudan, many children do not have the necessary documentation. For those children who are able to attend public primary schools, some are subject to bullying and harassment because of skin colour.

There are also problems for many, due to their socioeconomic situation. Teachers have noted that some children are unable to do their homework due to cramped living conditions and/or a lack of electricity at home. Moreover, many Sudanese families live in small one-room apartments, with as many as seven or eight people in one residence. Recently, the Danish embassy began funding a lunch program, as there was concern that children were coming to school hungry without having been fed at home.

Secondary education is not free for Sudanese refugees. Like foreigners, they must pay fees.

==== Refugee schools ====
The first refugee school was established in 1990 by Sudanese parents and teachers, and since then churches have become major service-providers for the Sudanese refugee population, particularly in the field of education. After recognizing the difficulties Sudanese children faced in accessing free education, many churches established refugee schools. There are three major learning centers for Sudanese refugees in Cairo providing primary education from kindergarten to tenth grade; namely Muwanga, Nusiriya and Afendiya, as well as several other smaller schools across the city.

Muwanga and Nusiriya schools abides by the Egyptian national curriculum, whereas Afendiya follows an American curriculum and teaches lessons in English. These refugee schools face similar problems to public schools in terms of overcrowding. In recent years, Muwanga school has seen its student body increase from 400 to 5000 students. Once again, socioeconomic conditions prevent many students from entering refugee schools. According to James Natale Finji, a principal of one of the schools, many of his students live in female-headed households, and most of the single mothers work as domestic servants, sometimes in distant cities, or they live in their employers' homes in Cairo. Their daughters sometimes drop out of school to care for their siblings.

Despite their popularity, Sudanese children attending these schools cannot obtain certificates recognized by the Egyptian or Sudanese governments. Rather, children must sit a final examination in Egyptian public schools, set by the Ministry of Education. The registration process for these end of term examinations is problematic for Sudanese refugees, as it requires the submission of documentation and identification, as well as the expense of a residency permit or iqama. As a result, many Sudanese children cannot advance beyond primary level education. According to Sudanese sociologist, Jane Kani Edward, this requirement "[...] represents a planned and constructed strategy to deny southern Sudanese refugee children access to education and success."

==== Higher education ====
There is a relatively long history of higher education among Sudanese in Egypt, dating back to 1972. Following the Addis Ababa Peace Agreement between the Egyptian government and the South Sudan Liberation Movement (SSLM), Sudanese students were granted free education in Egyptian universities under the "Egyptian Scholarship for Sudanese Students" program. Between 1972 and 1982 Sudanese students were granted scholarships each year. After the re-division of administrative districts in the south during 1982, the number admitted on the scholarship program rose to 300 students each year. This program was terminated in 1992. In recent years, higher education has become even less accessible for Sudanese students, as Egyptian universities have begun to charge refugee and foreign students high fees payable in hard currency. Moreover, due to reduced funding and a shift in policy, the UNHCR in Cairo has been limited in its capacity to assist students.

=== Effects of lack of refugee status ===
Rejection and closure of a file have serious psychological and emotional implications for refugees. Many of those rejected, especially men, turn to alcoholism as a way of overcoming their problems. Others become mentally disturbed and there have been reports of suicide or attempted suicide upon receiving news of the rejection.

Furthermore, the UNHCR identity cards issued to refugees are not always recognized by the Egyptian authority. There have been situations in which people have been taken and detained for three to four days and then released, despite their UNHCR status. A resident permit stamp on a valid Sudanese passport seems to offer more protection for refugees.

=== Women ===
Sudanese women and girls encounter distinct and severe hardships shaped by both past conflict and current conditions in Egypt. Many live with the consequences of gender based violence (GBV) experienced in Sudan without having received adequate medical or psychosocial support. In Egypt they remain exposed to harassment, exploitation, and abuse, including a continued risk of GBV, particularly in public spaces and informal work environments, often without effective legal protection.

A large number of households are headed by women whose partners remain in Sudan or work abroad, increasing economic and social pressures. At the same time, mothers report persistent anxiety over their children’s safety, amid fears of community hostility, detention, or deportation.

The unity of the family has been challenged by Sudanese refugees' quest for UNHCR recognition. Women and children wait in Cairo for their UNHCR applications to go through while husbands wait in Sudan. The difficulties of life in Cairo and the inability of some husbands to join their families in Egypt have forced some women refugees to abandon their husbands, remarry, and leave for resettlement. In cases of rejection of a family application at the UNHCR, many men leave their wives and children and look for another single woman with UNHCR status to avoid responsibility. Additionally, UNHCR RO Cairo does not recognize polygamous unions, and as such will not refer polygamists for resettlement to countries where polygamy is not permitted. All of these factors have contributed to the break-up of families, divorce, and the abandonment of children.

==== Childcare ====
Sudanese women in Cairo, particularly single mothers, are under pressure to work long hours in the informal economy as domestic workers. In some situations, children are forced to travel to school unaccompanied. Lack of childcare has also forced single mothers to leave their young children at home alone for hours at a time. Others have resorted to enrolling their children in refugee schools, despite being underage. This also poses problems for school teachers, who are faced with large classes of children of various ages and abilities.

=== Discrimination ===
Beyond all other difficulties, Sudanese refugees in Egypt have reported widespread discrimination. Sudanese women describe fears of bullying that restrict children’s mobility, while social stigma and racial prejudice have increased the risk of gender based violence against Sudanese women. Negative stereotypes portraying Sudanese refugees as an economic burden have further fueled hostility and racism within some local communities.

=== Support agencies ===
The main agency is Caritas Egypt, which is responsible for assessing the needs of refugees and providing cash assistance, which is approximately E£700 every two months for a maximum of six months. Africa and Middle East Refugee Assistance provides legal aid and psycho-social services.

In Cairo, the International Organization for Migration (IOM) is involved in helping process refugees for resettlement, moving refugees, and assisting with their medical examinations. IOM also conducts cultural orientation for the refugees to prepare them for resettlement in third countries. The UNHCR regional office in Cairo (RO Cairo) is overextended, and after Somalis, the Sudanese (mainly southern Sudanese) represent the largest caseload.

== Conflict with authorities ==
When Hosni Mubarak became the president in 1981, regulations were established to allow police to arrest and detain suspects for an undetermined period of time. Incidences of police brutality during raids and protests have led to the arbitrary detention of Sudanese refugees and, in some cases, death.

=== Shoot to stop ===
Egypt used to employ a "shoot to stop" policy against refugees attempting to continue to Israel. According to Human Rights Watch, more than 50 refugees, including women and children, have been shot by Egyptian border guards since 2007.

=== "Black Day" ===
In the Maadi district in 2003, from January 27 to 29, Egyptian police raided the residences of refugees from Sudan, Liberia and other African countries. Accounts of ill treatment such as discrimination and assault were reported by detainees–some of whom held refugee cards. A Liberian detainee reported:

I was taken into a police wagon on the street. They drove around to collect other black people. They would ask Egyptians on the street, "Where are the buildings where blacks live?" It was about one hour driving around like this. By the end there were ten or twelve Africans in the car.

— Anonymous, Human Rights Watch

According to the reports of other detained refugees, Egyptian police referred to the raid as "Black Day", labeling their intake sheets "Operation Track Down Blacks".

=== Mohandessin protests ===
In August 2004, Sudanese refugees, backed by the Egyptian non-governmental organisation SOUTH, mounted a protest against the issuing of yellow cards outside the UNHCR office. Police and security officers arrested and dispersed refugees with tear gas.

In October to December 2005, some 2,000 people participated daily in a protest camp in a park at a busy intersection in front of Mustafa Mahmoud Mosque. The camp was located in an upper middle class suburb where the UN High Commissioner for Refugees (UNHCR) had an office—protesting about conditions in Egypt and seeking to be resettled in another country. The camp had been formed on September 29, 2005, by several dozen people who organized with Refugee Voices, a Sudanese refugee group. The Cairo office of UNHCR closed indefinitely in mid-November, after saying it was forced by the sit-in to suspend operations in October.

In the early hours of Friday, December 30, 2005, the Police raided the camp and clashes ensued in the presence of TV cameras and the press. They dragged the refugees across the street, pulled women by their hair and pushed the elderly carrying newborn babies. Refugees were put in public transit busses to be transferred to central security force camps in different locations in Egypt in addition to taking some of them to State security intelligence offices. Many of those taken to the camps suffered fractures and injuries and lack any medical help.

At least 28, and as many as 100, Sudanese migrants seeking refugee status were killed. At least one committed suicide in the wake of the raid. The camp was forcibly dismantled and 2,174 protesters were detained. The incident named later the "Mustapha Mahmoud Park Massacre" led many refugees to decide to seek shelter in Israel.

Shortly after the arrests, the Egyptian Foreign Ministry announced it would deport 645 of the arrested people as "illegal immigrants". In late January, the government agreed to allow the UNHCR to perform a status determination on those it wishes to deport. 165 refugee card holders were released from custody. 485 remain in custody at Al-Qanater Prison, Abu Zaabal Prison, and Shebeen Al-Kom and other detention centres.

== See also ==
- Sudanese refugees in Israel
- Sudanese refugees in Chad
- St. Andrew's United Church in Cairo, a church and school serving mainly Sudanese refugees.
- Refugee kidnappings in Sinai
