= Sarra Triangle =

Area of land in Libya

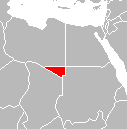
The Sarra Triangle, highlighted in red, and the surrounding countries with modern borders

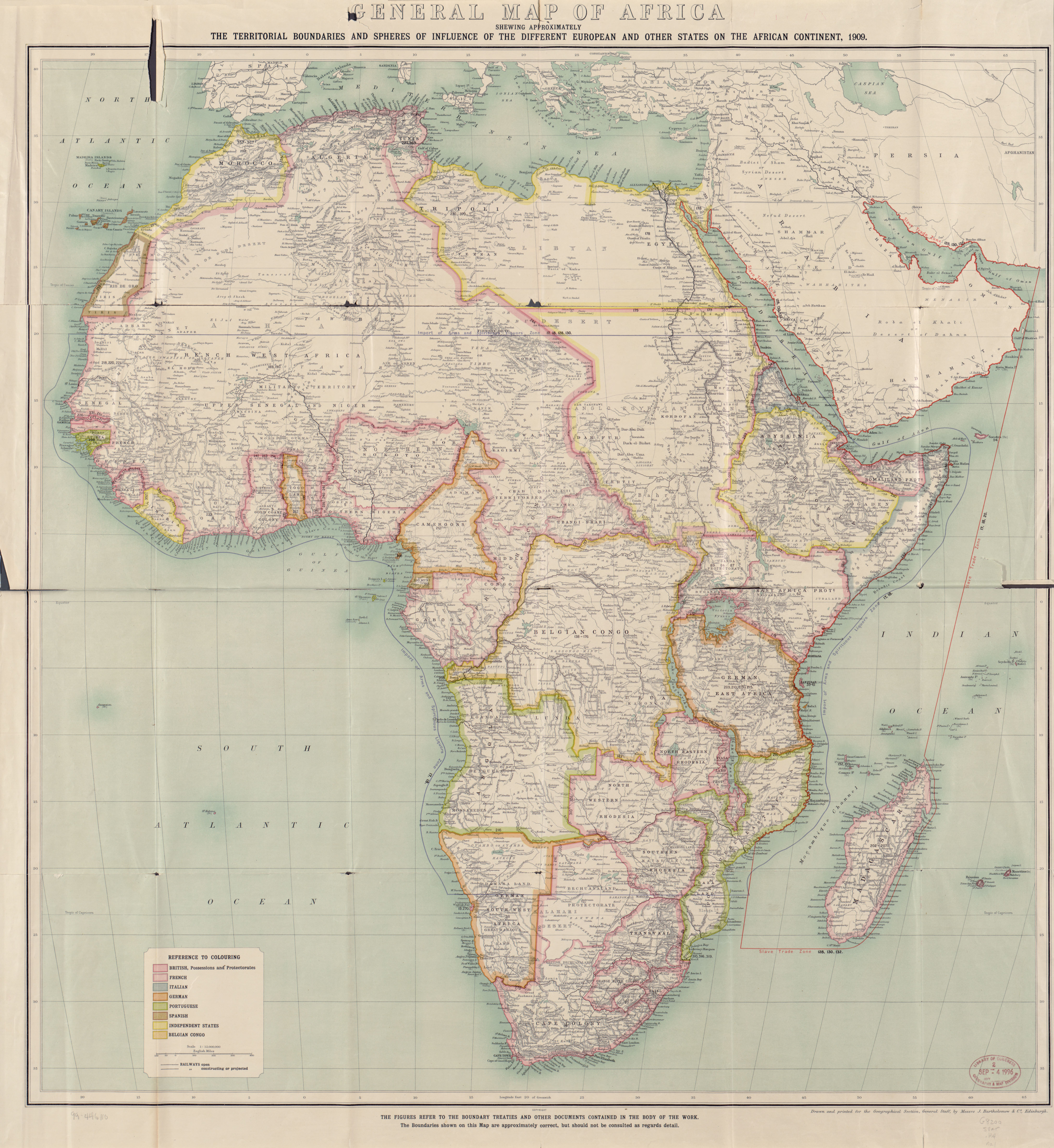
Map of Africa in 1909 - The Sarra triangle from the Anglo-Egyptian period is visible on it.

The Sarra Triangle is a strip of land, today located in the Kufra District of Libya's Cyrenaican geographical subdivision. The strip of land was originally claimed by Britain and added to Anglo-Egyptian Sudan, though Britain never held any de facto authority over the strip. In 1934 an agreement was struck between the United Kingdom and the Kingdom of Italy, ceding the territory to the Italian colony in Libya. The land is home to a minor oasis called Ma'tan as-Sarra.

The present borders were established by an agreement signed in Rome on July 20, 1934. The border thus established by the agreement transferred the administration of the Sarra triangle from Anglo-Egyptian Sudan to Italian Libya, adding approximately 30,000 square kilometers of area.

== See also ==
- Aouzou Strip
- Bir Tawil
- Halaib Triangle
- Bermuda Triangle
- Decolonisation of Africa
- Anglo-Egyptian Sudan
- Kingdom of Egypt
- Egypt–Sudan border
- Libya–Sudan relations
- Libya–Sudan border
- Sultanate of Egypt
- Khedivate of Egypt
- Sultanate of Darfur
