= Circles of latitude between the 20th parallel north and the 25th parallel north =

Circles of latitude

Following are circles of latitude between the 20th parallel north and the 25th parallel north:

== 21st parallel north ==
21st parallel north (interactive map)

The 21st parallel north is a circle of latitude that is 21 degrees north of the Earth's equatorial plane. It crosses Africa, Asia, the Indian Ocean, the Pacific Ocean, North America, the Caribbean, and the Atlantic Ocean.

At this latitude the sun is visible for 13 hours, 25 minutes during the summer solstice and 10 hours, 51 minutes during the winter solstice.

=== Around the world ===
Starting at the Prime Meridian and heading eastwards, the parallel 21° north passes through:

Coordinates	Country, territory or sea	Notes
21°0′N 0°0′E	Mali	
21°0′N 1°11′E	Algeria	
21°0′N 7°42′E	Niger	
21°0′N 15°36′E	Chad	
21°0′N 21°5′E	Libya	
21°0′N 25°0′E	Sudan	
21°0′N 37°7′E	Indian Ocean	Red Sea
21°0′N 39°17′E	Saudi Arabia	
21°0′N 55°20′E	Oman	
21°0′N 58°48′E	Indian Ocean	Arabian Sea
21°0′N 70°14′E	India	Gujarat - Kathiawar peninsula
21°0′N 71°40′E	Indian Ocean	Gulf of Khambhat
21°0′N 72°44′E	India	Gujarat; Maharashtra; Chhattisgarh; Orissa
21°0′N 86°53′E	Indian Ocean	Bay of Bengal
21°0′N 92°11′E	Bangladesh	
21°0′N 92°16′E	Myanmar (Burma)	
21°0′N 100°33′E	Laos	
21°0′N 103°4′E	Vietnam	Mainland and some islands; passing through Hanoi
21°0′N 107°50′E	Pacific Ocean	Gulf of Tonkin - passing just south of Weizhou Island, Guangxi, China
21°0′N 109°41′E	China	Guangdong (Leizhou Peninsula and Donghai Island)
21°0′N 110°31′E	South China Sea	Passing just south of Mavudis island, Philippines
21°0′N 121°56′E	Pacific Ocean	Passing between Molokai and Lanai islands, Hawaii, United States
21°0′N 156°40′W	United States	Island of Maui, Hawaii
21°0′N 156°33′W	Pacific Ocean	
21°0′N 105°20′W	Mexico	passing just south of León, Guanajuato
21°0′N 97°19′W	Gulf of Mexico	Bay of Campeche
21°0′N 90°20′W	Mexico	Yucatán Peninsula - passing through Mérida
21°0′N 86°49′W	Caribbean Sea	
21°0′N 79°13′W	Cuba	Doce Leguas Cays
21°0′N 79°10′W	Caribbean Sea	
21°0′N 78°26′W	Cuba	
21°0′N 75°34′W	Atlantic Ocean	
21°0′N 73°42′W	Bahamas	Great Inagua island
21°0′N 73°8′W	Atlantic Ocean	Passing to the south of the southernmost cays of the Turks and Caicos Islands
21°0′N 17°3′W	Western Sahara	Claimed by Morocco - Ras Nouadhibou peninsula
21°0′N 17°2′W	Mauritania	Ras Nouadhibou peninsula
21°0′N 17°0′W	Atlantic Ocean	
21°0′N 16°50′W	Mauritania	
21°0′N 6°6′W	Mali	

== 22nd parallel north ==
22nd parallel north (interactive map)

In Africa, the parallel defines most of the border between Egypt and Sudan. The eastern part of the border is disputed.

The 22nd parallel north is a circle of latitude that is 22 degrees north of the Earth's equatorial plane. It crosses Africa, Asia, the Indian Ocean, the Pacific Ocean, North America, the Caribbean, and the Atlantic Ocean.

In 1899, the 22nd parallel was used by British colonial authorities to define the Egypt–Sudan border. Although Egypt continues to claim the 22nd parallel as its southern border, Sudan claims a later colonial border dating to 1902, resulting in the Halaib Triangle being claimed by both countries and Bir Tawil being unclaimed by any UN member state.

At this latitude the sun is visible for 13 hours, 29 minutes during the summer solstice and 10 hours, 47 minutes during the winter solstice.

=== Around the world ===
Starting at the Prime Meridian and heading eastwards, the parallel 22° north passes through:

Coordinates	Country, territory or sea	Notes
22°0′N 0°0′E	Algeria	
22°0′N 9°21′E	Niger	
22°0′N 15°11′E	Chad	
22°0′N 19°4′E	Libya	
22°0′N 25°0′E	Egypt / Sudan border	
22°0′N 31°19′E	Sudan	The border diverts north at Lake Nasser, enclosing the Wadi Halfa Salient - as it passes through the lake, the parallel is entirely within Sudan
22°0′N 31°24′E	Egypt / Sudan border	
22°0′N 33°10′E	Egypt / Bir Tawil border	Bir Tawil is not claimed by any country.
22°0′N 34°5′E	Hala'ib Triangle / Sudan border	The Hala'ib Triangle is a disputed territory claimed by both Egypt and Sudan - Egypt controls the territory.
22°0′N 36°52′E	Red Sea	
22°0′N 38°56′E	Saudi Arabia	
22°0′N 55°40′E	Oman	
22°0′N 59°39′E	Indian Ocean	Arabian Sea
22°0′N 69°10′E	India	Gujarat - Kathiawar Peninsula
22°0′N 72°14′E	Indian Ocean	Gulf of Khambhat
22°0′N 72°30′E	India	Gujarat; Madhya Pradesh; Chhattisgarh; Orissa; West Bengal
22°0′N 89°5′E	Bangladesh	Several islands in the Ganges Delta
22°0′N 90°41′E	Indian Ocean	Bay of Bengal
22°0′N 91°53′E	Bangladesh	
22°0′N 92°36′E	India	For about 3 km
22°0′N 92°38′E	Myanmar (Burma)	Mandalay
22°0′N 92°53′E	India	For about 4 km
22°0′N 92°56′E	Myanmar (Burma)	For about 5 km
22°0′N 92°58′E	India	For about 3 km
22°0′N 93°0′E	Myanmar (Burma)	
22°0′N 99°59′E	China	Yunnan - passing just north of Jinghong, Xishuangbanna Dai Autonomous Prefecture
22°0′N 101°37′E	Laos	
22°0′N 102°29′E	Vietnam	
22°0′N 106°41′E	China	Guangxi (for about 4 km)
22°0′N 106°44′E	Vietnam	For about 6 km
22°0′N 106°48′E	China	Guangxi and Guangdong
22°0′N 113°22′E	South China Sea	
22°0′N 113°44′E	Macau	Passing through islands in the Wanshan Archipelago (Guangdong), about 12 km south of Macau
22°0′N 113°50′E	South China Sea	
22°0′N 114°8′E	Hong Kong	More islands in the Wanshan Archipelago (Guangdong), about 20 km south of Hong Kong
22°0′N 114°13′E	South China Sea	
22°0′N 120°41′E	Republic of China (Taiwan)	Passing through Hengchun and Kenting (claimed by China)
22°0′N 120°52′E	Pacific Ocean	Passing just south of Orchid Island, Republic of China (claimed by China)
22°0′N 160°6′W	United States	Island of Niihau, Hawaii
22°0′N 160°3′W	Pacific Ocean	
22°0′N 159°46′W	United States	Island of Kauai, Hawaii - passing just north of Lihue
22°0′N 159°21′W	Pacific Ocean	Passing just north of the island of San Juanito, Mexico
22°0′N 105°39′W	Mexico	Passing 8 km north of Aguascalientes
22°0′N 97°43′W	Gulf of Mexico	
22°0′N 84°36′W	Cuba	
22°0′N 84°0′W	Caribbean Sea	Gulf of Batabanó - passing just north of Isla de la Juventud, Cuba; Gulf of Cazones - passing just south of the Zapata Peninsula, Cuba
22°0′N 80°23′W	Cuba	Passing 3 km north of Sancti Spíritus
22°0′N 77°38′W	Atlantic Ocean	Passing between islands of the Bahamas; Passing just north of North Caicos, Turks and Caicos Islands
22°0′N 16°52′W	Western Sahara	Claimed by Morocco
22°0′N 13°4′W	Mauritania	
22°0′N 6°13′W	Mali	
22°0′N 0°9′W	Algeria	

== 23rd parallel north ==
23rd parallel north (interactive map)

The 23rd parallel north is a circle of latitude that is 23 degrees north of the Earth's equatorial plane, about 50 kilometres (31 mi) south of the Tropic of Cancer. It crosses Africa, Asia, the Indian Ocean, the Pacific Ocean, North America, the Caribbean, and the Atlantic Ocean.

At this latitude the sun is visible for 13 hours, 33 minutes during the summer solstice and 10 hours, 43 minutes during the winter solstice.

=== Around the world ===
Starting at the Prime Meridian and heading eastwards, the parallel 23° north passes through:

Coordinates	Country, territory or sea	Notes
23°0′N 0°0′E	Algeria	
23°0′N 11°3′E	Niger	
23°0′N 13°46′E	Libya	
23°0′N 15°0′E	Chad	
23°0′N 16°58′E	Libya	
23°0′N 25°0′E	Egypt	
23°0′N 35°27′E	Hala'ib Triangle	Claimed by both Egypt and Sudan - Egypt controls the territory
23°0′N 35°40′E	Red Sea	
23°0′N 38°48′E	Saudi Arabia	
23°0′N 52°32′E	United Arab Emirates	Emirate of Abu Dhabi
23°0′N 55°13′E	Oman	
23°0′N 59°7′E	Indian Ocean	Arabian Sea
23°0′N 68°54′E	India	Gujarat - passing just south of Ahmedabad; Madhya Pradesh; Chhattisgarh; Jharkhand; West Bengal
23°0′N 88°52′E	Bangladesh	
23°0′N 91°32′E	India	Tripura - for about 20 km (12 mi)
23°0′N 91°43′E	Bangladesh	
23°0′N 92°23′E	India	Mizoram
23°0′N 93°8′E	Myanmar (Burma)	
23°0′N 99°31′E	China	Yunnan
23°0′N 104°50′E	Vietnam	
23°0′N 105°48′E	China	Guangxi; Guangdong — passing just south of Guangzhou
23°0′N 116°31′E	South China Sea	
23°0′N 120°7′E	Republic of China (Taiwan)	Passing through Tainan (claimed by China)
23°0′N 121°19′E	Pacific Ocean	Passing just south of the island of Nīhoa, Hawaii, United States
23°0′N 110°5′W	Mexico	Baja California peninsula
23°0′N 109°42′W	Gulf of California	
23°0′N 106°11′W	Mexico	
23°0′N 97°46′W	Gulf of Mexico	
23°0′N 83°13′W	Cuba	Passing just south of Havana
23°0′N 79°59′W	Atlantic Ocean	
23°0′N 74°55′W	Bahamas	Long Island
23°0′N 74°51′W	Atlantic Ocean	Passing just north of Crooked Island, Bahamas; Passing just south of Samana Cay, Bahamas
23°0′N 16°8′W	Western Sahara	Claimed by Morocco
23°0′N 13°5′W	Mauritania	
23°0′N 6°20′W	Mali	
23°0′N 1°40′W	Algeria	

== 24th parallel north ==
24th parallel north (interactive map)

The 24th parallel north is a circle of latitude that is 24 degrees north of the Earth's equatorial plane, about 60 kilometres (37 mi) north of the Tropic of Cancer. It is the line which demarcates boundary between Pakistan and India in the general area of Rann of Kutch. It also crosses Africa, Asia, the Indian Ocean, the Pacific Ocean, North America, and the Atlantic Ocean.

At this latitude the sun is visible for 13 hours, 37 minutes during the summer solstice and 10 hours, 39 minutes during the winter solstice.

=== Around the world ===
Starting at the Prime Meridian and heading eastwards, the parallel 24° north passes through:

Coordinates	Country, territory or sea	Notes
24°0′N 0°0′E	Algeria	
24°0′N 11°42′E	Libya	
24°0′N 25°0′E	Egypt	
24°0′N 35°42′E	Red Sea	
24°0′N 38°9′E	Saudi Arabia	Yanbu, Al Madinah Region; Riyadh Region; Eastern Region
24°0′N 51°41′E	United Arab Emirates	Emirate of Abu Dhabi - for about 13 km (8.1 mi)
24°0′N 51°49′E	Persian Gulf	
24°0′N 52°19′E	United Arab Emirates	Emirate of Abu Dhabi
24°0′N 55°35′E	Oman	
24°0′N 57°6′E	Indian Ocean	Arabian Sea
24°0′N 67°24′E	Pakistan	Sindh
24°0′N 68°45′E	India	Gujarat - for about 8 km (5.0 mi); Rajasthan - for about 12 km (7.5 mi); Madhya Pradesh; Uttar Pradesh; Chhattisgarh; Jharkhand; West Bengal
24°0′N 88°44′E	Bangladesh	For about 1 km (0.62 mi)
24°0′N 88°45′E	India	West Bengal - for about 2 km (1.2 mi)
24°0′N 88°46′E	Bangladesh	
24°0′N 91°22′E	India	Tripura; Mizoram
24°0′N 93°20′E	Myanmar (Burma)	For about 14 km (8.7 mi)
24°0′N 93°28′E	India	Manipur - for about 15 km (9.3 mi)
24°0′N 93°37′E	Myanmar	For about 16 km (9.9 mi)
24°0′N 93°46′E	India	Manipur
24°0′N 94°13′E	Myanmar	
24°0′N 97°36′E	China	Ruili, Yunnan, for about 28 km (17 mi)
24°0′N 97°53′E	Myanmar	Muse, Myanmar
24°0′N 98°46′E	China	Yunnan, Guangxi, Guangdong, and Fujian
24°0′N 117°48′E	South China Sea	Taiwan Strait
24°0′N 120°21′E	Republic of China (Taiwan)	Passing through Changhua, Nantou, Central Mountain Range, and Hualien (claimed by China)
24°0′N 121°38′E	Pacific Ocean	Passing just south of Hateruma island, Japan; Passing just south of South Iwo Jima island, Japan; Passing just north of Tern Island, Hawaii, United States
24°0′N 110°55′W	Mexico	Baja California peninsula
24°0′N 109°49′W	Gulf of California	
24°0′N 107°4′W	Mexico	Passing through Durango
24°0′N 97°44′W	Gulf of Mexico	
24°0′N 80°21′W	Bahamas	Cay Sal Bank atoll
24°0′N 79°50′W	Atlantic Ocean	
24°0′N 77°50′W	Bahamas	Andros island
24°0′N 77°32′W	Atlantic Ocean	
24°0′N 76°20′W	Bahamas	Exuma cays
24°0′N 76°19′W	Atlantic Ocean	Passing just south of Cat Island, Bahamas; Passing just north of Conception Island, Bahamas
24°0′N 74°32′W	Bahamas	San Salvador Island
24°0′N 74°27′W	Atlantic Ocean	
24°0′N 15°40′W	Western Sahara	Claimed by Morocco
24°0′N 12°0′W	Mauritania	
24°0′N 6°27′W	Mali	
24°0′N 3°15′W	Algeria	

== 25th parallel north ==
25th parallel north (interactive map)

In Africa, the parallel defines part of the border between Mauritania and Mali.

The 25th parallel north is a circle of latitude that is 25 degrees north of the Earth's equatorial plane. It crosses Africa, Asia, the Indian Ocean, the Pacific Ocean, North America and the Atlantic Ocean.

The northernmost section of the border between Mauritania and Mali is defined by the parallel.

At this latitude the sun is visible for 13 hours, 42 minutes during the summer solstice and 10 hours, 35 minutes during the winter solstice.

The area between the 25th and 26th parallels north is the most populated latitude band, with 279 million people as of 2022.

=== Around the world ===
Starting at the Prime Meridian and heading eastwards, the parallel 25° north passes through:

Coordinates	Country, territory or sea	Notes
25°0′N 0°0′E	Algeria	
25°0′N 10°2′E	Libya	
25°0′N 25°0′E	Egypt	
25°0′N 34°57′E	Red Sea	
25°0′N 37°17′E	Saudi Arabia	
25°0′N 50°38′E	Persian Gulf	Gulf of Bahrain
25°0′N 50°48′E	Qatar	
25°0′N 51°38′E	Persian Gulf	
25°0′N 55°3′E	United Arab Emirates	Passing through Dubai
25°0′N 56°22′E	Indian Ocean	Arabian Sea, Passing through Gulf of Oman
25°0′N 66°42′E	Pakistan	Balochistan - for about 16 km Sindh - passing just north of Karachi
25°0′N 70°55′E	India	Rajasthan; Madhya Pradesh; Uttar Pradesh; Bihar; Jharkhand; West Bengal
25°0′N 88°24′E	Bangladesh	
25°0′N 92°25′E	India	Assam; Manipur
25°0′N 94°43′E	Myanmar (Burma)	
25°0′N 97°43′E	China	Yunnan - passing just to the south of Kunming; Guizhou; Guangxi; Hunan; Guangdong; Jiangxi; Fujian
25°0′N 118°59′E	South China Sea	Taiwan Strait
25°0′N 121°1′E	Republic of China (Taiwan)	Island of Taiwan (so claimed by China) - passing just south of Taipei
25°0′N 121°59′E	Pacific Ocean	Passing just north of Miyako-jima, Japan; Passing just north of Iwo Jima, Japan
25°0′N 168°0′W	United States	Passing through the islet of Little Rock, Gardner Pinnacles, Hawaii
25°0′N 168°0′W	Pacific Ocean	
25°0′N 112°12′W	Mexico	Isla Magdalena; Baja California Sur mainland Isla San José
25°0′N 110°34′W	Gulf of California	
25°0′N 108°13′W	Mexico	Isla Altamura; Isla Talchichitle; Sinaloa; Durango; Coahuila; Nuevo León; Tamaulipas
25°0′N 97°32′W	Gulf of Mexico	
25°0′N 80°32′W	United States	Island of Key Largo, Florida
25°0′N 80°31′W	Atlantic Ocean	Straits of Florida
25°0′N 78°10′W	Bahamas	Island of Andros
25°0′N 77°57′W	Atlantic Ocean	
25°0′N 77°33′W	Bahamas	Island of New Providence - passing just south of Nassau
25°0′N 77°20′W	Atlantic Ocean	
25°0′N 76°9′W	Bahamas	Island of Eleuthera
25°0′N 76°8′W	Atlantic Ocean	
25°0′N 14°50′W	Western Sahara	Claimed by Morocco and the Sahrawi Republic
25°0′N 12°0′W	Mauritania	
25°0′N 6°34′W	Mauritania / Mali border	
25°0′N 4°49′W	Algeria	

== See also ==
- Circles of latitude between the 15th parallel north and the 20th parallel north
- Circles of latitude between the 25th parallel north and the 30th parallel north
