= Egypt–Sudan border =

International border

Map of the 22nd parallel north which forms most of the Egypt-Sudan border

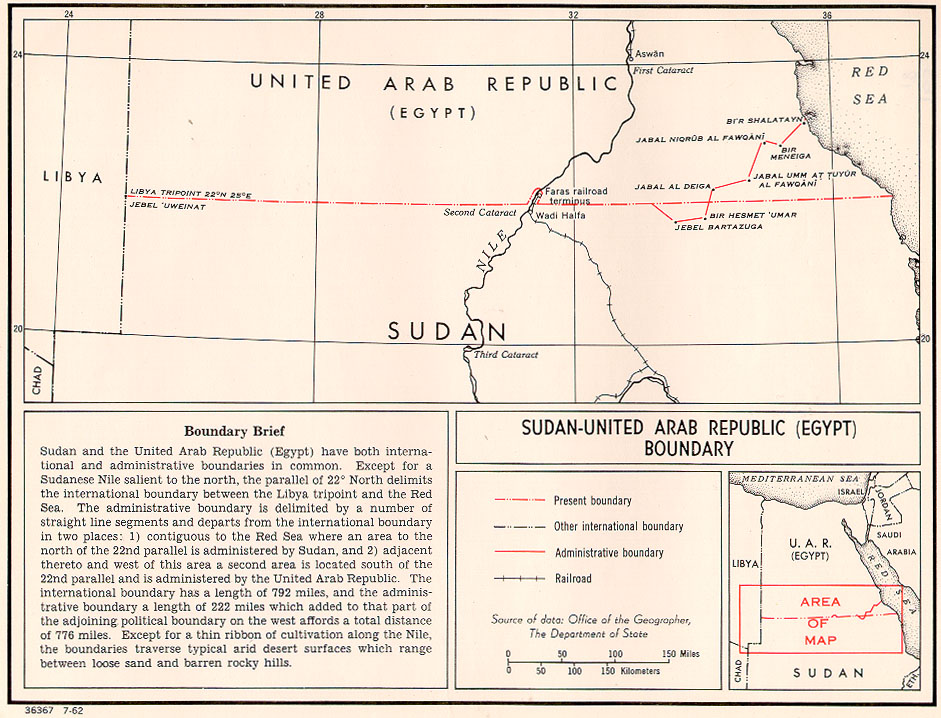
Map of the Egypt-Sudan border

The Egypt–Sudan border (Arabic: الحدود السودانية المصرية) is 1,276 km (793 mi) in length and runs from the tripoint with Libya in the west to the Red Sea in the east. The eastern section of the border is subject to a territorial dispute between the two states.

== Description ==
The border starts in the west at the tripoint with Libya on Gabal El Uweinat and then proceeds eastwards along the 22nd parallel north to Lake Nasser. The border then briefly veers northwards, creating an area known as the 'Wadi Halfa Salient', before resuming its course along the 22nd parallel out to the Red Sea just south of Cape Elba (Ras Hadarba). Sudan maintains that the border diverges about 183 kilometres (114 mi) east of the salient, shifting south so as to leave Bir Tawil in Egypt, and then north-east so as to include the Halaib Triangle within Sudan. The boundary traverses a thinly populated region of the Sahara Desert and Libyan Desert known traditionally as Nubia, with the main population centers being around the river Nile in the vicinity of Wadi Halfa.

== History ==
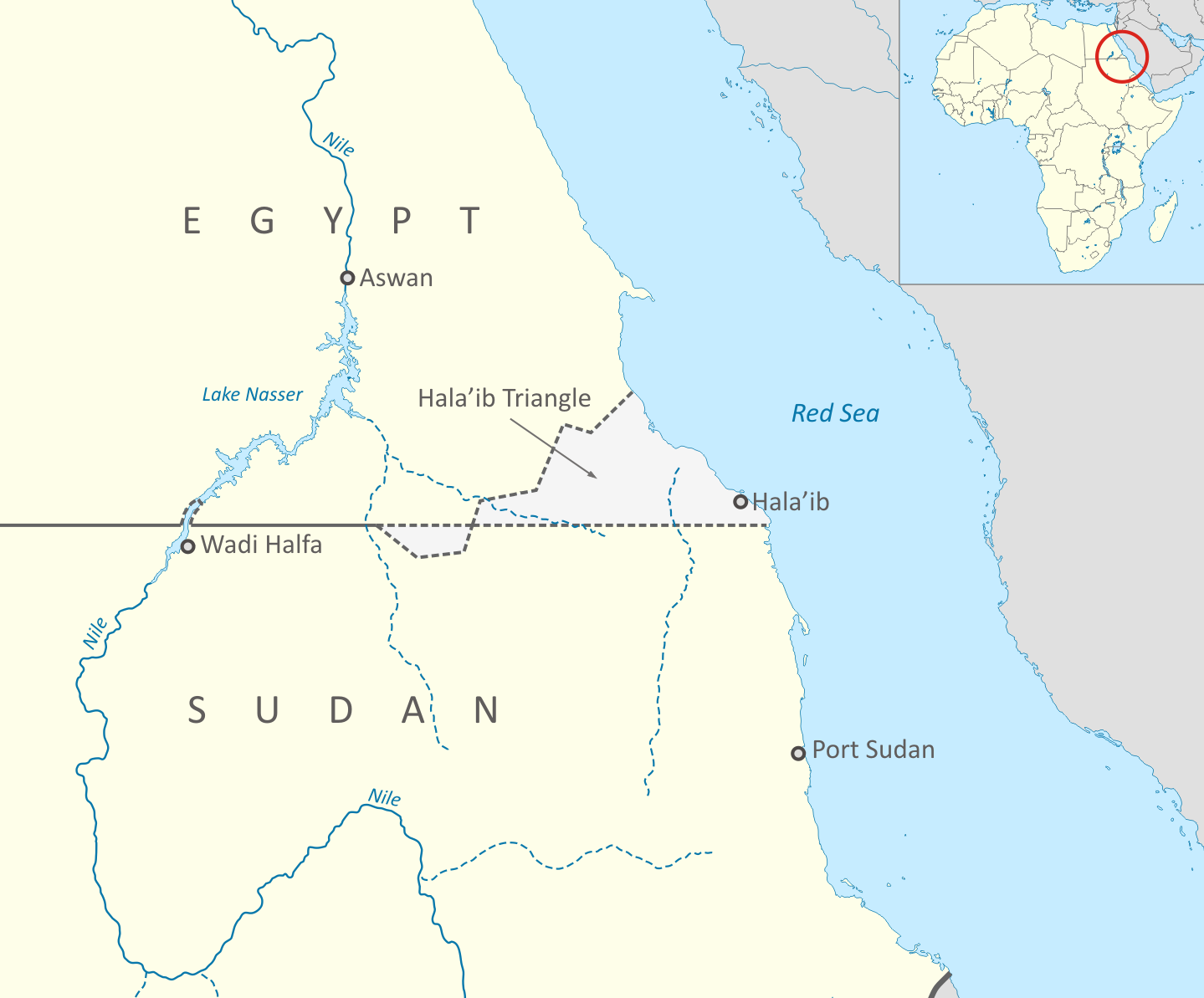
Map showing the disputed Halayib Triangle, with Bir Tawil to the immediate west

Egypt and Sudan are both ancient civilizations, with a long history of human settlement and complex societies dating back thousands of years, with the region of northern Sudan, known as Nubia, particularly intertwined with the history of Ancient Egypt; both sharing cultural and political connections along the Nile River valley throughout antiquity. Both countries have numerous archaeological sites showcasing their ancient past, including pyramids, temples, and burial grounds to 4000 BC. The northern region of Sudan was known as Kush in ancient times and had a powerful kingdom that interacted significantly with Egypt, sometimes even ruling parts of it. Following the Battle of Actium and Battle of Alexandria in 30 BC, Rome gained control of Egypt, which became a major grain producer for the empire led by Octavian who became the Roman Emperor with the title Augustus. The primary power in Sudan during the Roman period was the Kingdom of Kush, which resisted Roman expansion. The Roman military campaigns into northern Sudan did not establish permanent control over the region due to the conflict between Rome and Nubia. Egypt, though nominally part of the Ottoman Empire, had acquired a large degree of autonomy under Muhammad Ali following the Second Egyptian-Ottoman War of 1839–1841. In 1882, the British occupied Egypt, effectively establishing a protectorate (formally declared only in 1914). Egypt's traditional claim to Sudan was maintained, and following a war against Mahdist forces in the 1890s, the British conquered Sudan and created Anglo-Egyptian Sudan in January 1899 as a condominium state, divided from Egypt along the 22nd parallel. The Wadi Halfa salient was added to Sudan on 26 March 1899 in order place a rail terminus from Khartoum under Sudanese control. A further agreement of 1902 created an 'administrative boundary' in the east in order to facilitate the administration of various nomadic peoples, thereby creating the Bir Tawil region (to Egypt) and the Halayib triangle (to Anglo-Egyptian Sudan).

Egypt gained full independence in 1922, and in 1956, the Anglo-Egyptian condominium was terminated with Sudan becoming independent. South Sudan declared independence from Sudan in 2011, following a referendum after 55 years of Sudan gaining independence from Britain and Egypt. At that point the 1902 agreement remained in force, however in 1958, Egypt re-asserted the 1899 boundary, a move protested by Sudan. After a brief show of force Egyptian forces withdrew from the region, and the dispute thereafter lay dormant. In 1959, Egypt and Sudan signed a treaty that paved the way for Egypt to create the Aswan Dam, which had the knock-on effect of flooding much of the Wadi Halfa salient under Lake Nasser.

The Halayib dispute flared up again in 1992 when it looked as if oil might be discovered off its coast. Egypt moved troops into the area, effectively establishing Egyptian control, despite the protestations of Sudan. Thereafter, then Sudanese President Omar al-Bashir reiterated the Sudanese claim of sovereignty over Halayib in a 2010 speech in Port Sudan, saying "Halayeb is Sudanese and will always be Sudanese." At present the 1899 border is de facto in effect, leaving Bir Tawil in the unique position of being the only non-polar piece of land not claimed by any country on Earth.

== Settlements near the border ==
=== Egypt ===
- Shalateen (disputed)

=== Sudan ===
- Faras (historic)
- Wadi Halfa
- Selima Oasis

== See also ==
- Egypt–Libya border
- Kingdom of Kush
- Nubians
- Roman Egypt
- Kushites
- Egypt–Sudan relations
- Roman relations with Nubia
- Darb El Arba'īn, a historic trade route traversing the area
