= Ababda tribe =

Tribe in eastern Egypt and Sudan

Ababda
- Arabized Beja tribe
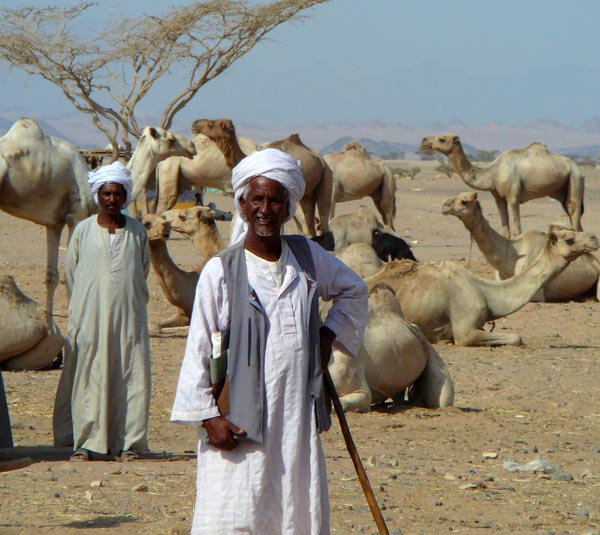
- A tribesman in the Shalateen camel market
- Ethnicity: Beja
- Location: Eastern Egypt and Sudan
- Population: 250,000+
- Language: Arabic
- Religion: Sunni Islam

The Ababda (Arabic: العبابدة, romanized: al-ʿabābdah or Arabic: عبّادي, romanized: ʿabbādī) are an arabized Beja tribe in eastern Egypt and Sudan. Historically, most were nomads living in the area between the Nile and the Red Sea, from Qena to Berber on the Nile and from Halayeb to Hurghada on the Red Sea. The Ababda are considered to be a Beja subtribe. Most Ababda now speak Arabic and claim descent from Kawahla while also considering themselves Beja. The Ababda have a total population of over 250,000 people.

== Tribal Origin ==
Ababda tribal origin narratives identify them as the descendants of an alleged common ancestor by the name of Abad. Abad is said to be a descendant of Kahil, the common ancestor of the Kawahla and the Ababda claim that Kahil was a descendant of Zubayr ibn al-Awwam, a companion of the Islamic prophet Muhammad. Claims of descent from Selman of the Banu Hilal have also been heard through Ababda in Shendi during the 19th century. other Beja like the Bishareen and the Amarar claim Kahili descent through their tribal ancestors, Bishar and Amar respectively, though the Amarar claim that Kahil was a descendant of Walid ibn al-Mughira, not Zubayr ibn al-Awwam.

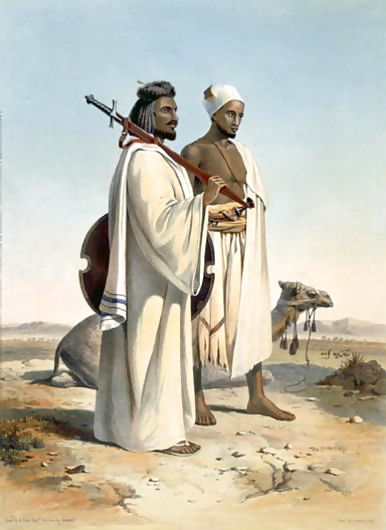
Two Ababda men in 1848

The Ababda may have formed through an Arab-Beja alliance, similar to the alliance between the Rabia and the Hedareb in the late ninth century

Despite the Arab genealogy there is nothing pointing to an Arab origin of the Ababda, The Ababda are virtually indistinguishable from the Bishareen and the rest of the Beja except through language.

== History ==
Camel support was provided by Ababda during the Turco-Egyptian conquest of Sudan, in return the Egyptian government recognized their control of the route and allowed them to levy a 10% toll on all goods passing through their lands.

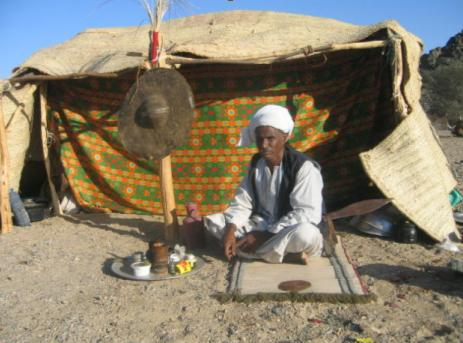
Ababda man

== Identity ==
The Ababda consider themselves to be Beja and at the same time of Kawahla descent. The Ababda refer to themselves as Arabs, not as an ethnic identifier but to refer to their nomadic lifestyle, in contrast to the settled Fellahin on the Nile valley.

== Language ==
=== Arabic ===
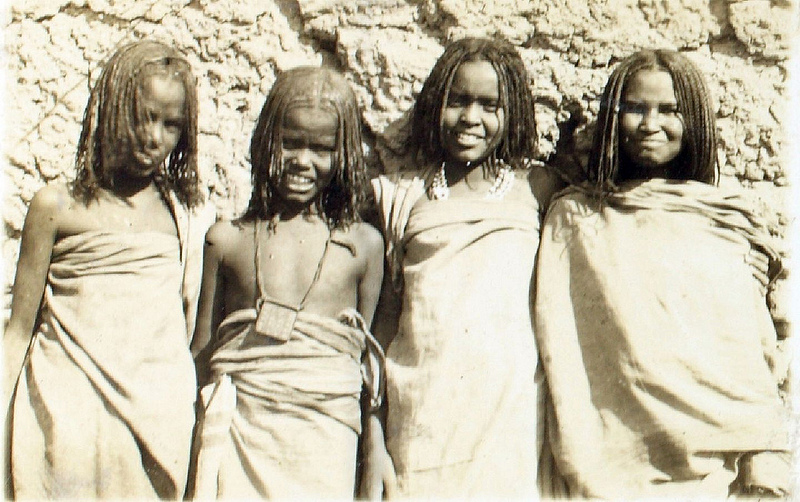
Ababda girls

The Ababda dialect of Arabic is considered to be a northern extension of Sudanese dialects. The closest dialect to the Ababda dialect is that of the Shukria of eastern Sudan. The Ababda dialect is heavily influenced by the Beja language.

=== Beja ===
Numerous traveler accounts from the nineteenth century and before that report that the Ababda at that time still spoke Beja or a language of their own. As late as the second half of the 19th century the Ababda were bilingual in Arabic and a Beja language that was either identical or closely related to Bisharin.

== Culture ==
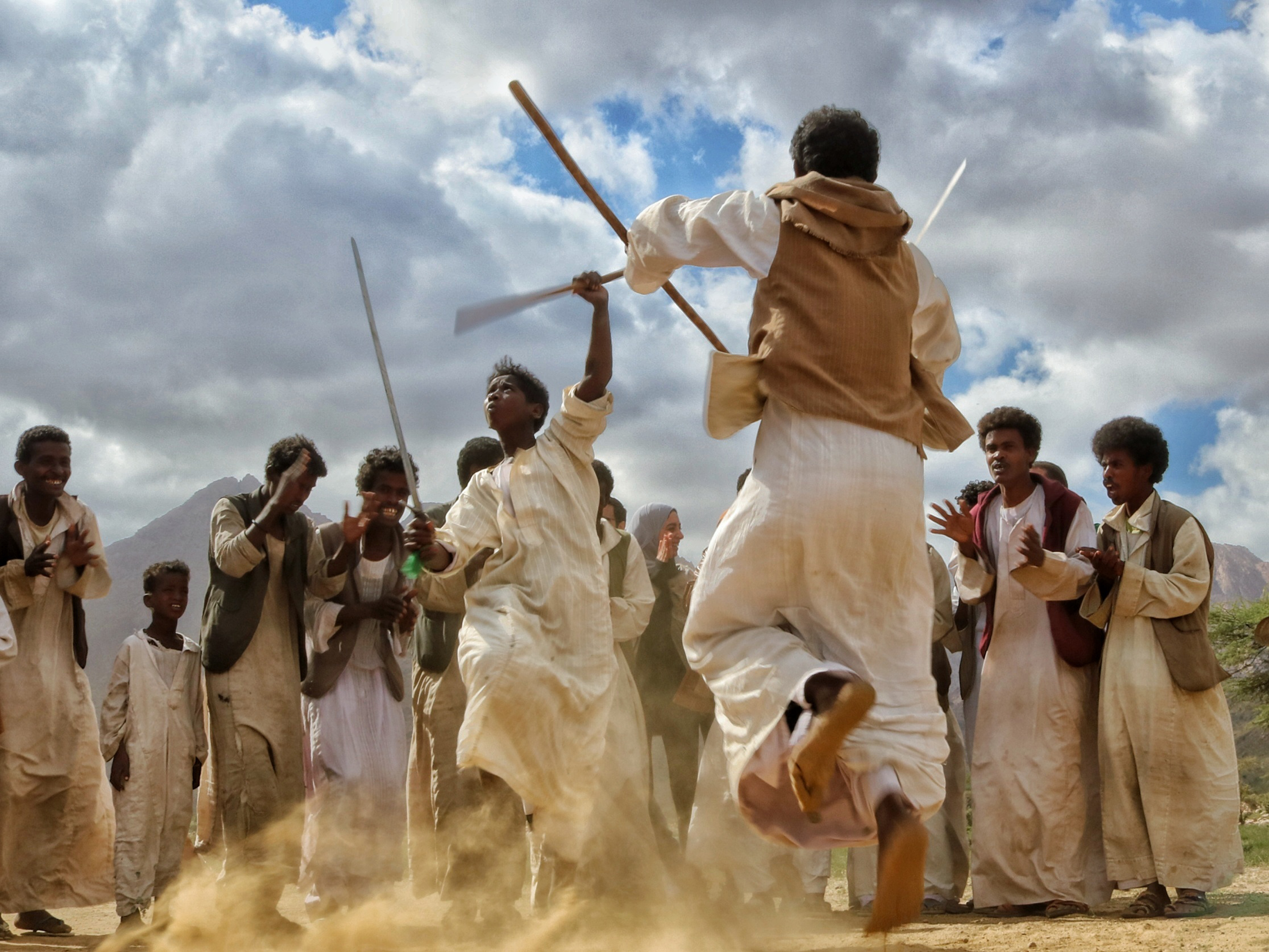
The Hosheeb/Terbal dance common among the Ababda and Bishareen

Ababda culture is mainly the same as the culture of other Beja groups but with slightly more Arab and Upper Egyptian influence. One of the most important parts of Ababda and Beja culture generally is the Jabana, it is a type of coffee which is made using roasted coffee beans and ginger. An important aspect of Ababda culture is dance, the two most known dances among the Ababda are the Shakreeb and Hosheeb dances. During Shakreeb, men form a line with one of them playing the Tanbura while 2 others dance opposite the line, they compete and try to out-jump each other, while women and other spectators announce a winner using ululations. Hosheeb is a dance where a group of singing men gather around two other men who are facing each other while holding their sword and shield high and shaking their sword using their wrist to the rhythm of the men in the line singing, stamping and clapping. The shields used in Hosheeb are usually made of elephant or giraffe hide. Terbal, Housiet or Maggad are other names for Hosheeb, while Beebob is another name for Shakreeb.

== See also ==
- Beja people
- Bishareen
- Zubayr ibn al-Awwam
- Halaib Triangle
- Bir Tawil
- Red Sea State
