= Khekeret-nisut =

Debated Ancient Egyptian woman's title

sw Xkr

Khekeret-nisut is a much debated Ancient Egyptian woman's title. Women with this title are known from the First Intermediate Period, less often from the Middle Kingdom, but again often from the Second Intermediate Period and the New Kingdom. The title is often translated as lady in waiting or king's ornament.

The title holders are most often married women of high status. In the Eleventh Dynasty, some queens of Mentuhotep II had that title. Henry George Fischer translated the title as ornament of the king and saw the women with this title as part of the king's harem. Harco Willems argued that the correct translation is adorner of the king and argued that they were playing some role in the king's cult.

== Literature ==
- Danijela Stefanovic: The Non-royal Regular Feminine Titles of the Middle Kingdom and Second Intermediate Period: Dossiers, London 2009 pp. 85- 109 ISBN 978-1-906137-12-0
