= Association for Linguistic Typology =

Linguistics society

The Association for Linguistic Typology (ALT) is a professional society for linguists interested in linguistic typology (general comparative linguistics, as opposed to historical-comparative linguistics). It was founded in 1995. The ALT has several hundred members; and through its website, its annual meetings, and its journal Linguistic Typology it works to disseminate and highlight current research in comparative grammar.

The founding of ALT was initiated by Frans Plank in 1994, after the European Science Foundation's EUROTYP programme (1990–1994) had for the first time brought together dozens of typologists from Europe and beyond.

== Publications ==
Since 1997, the ALT has published the journal Linguistic Typology in association with De Gruyter Mouton. It was first edited by Frans Plank, followed by the current editor, Maria Koptjevskaja-Tamm.

== Meetings ==
Since 1997, the ALT has organized biennial conferences on different continents.

Meeting	place	date
15	Beijing Normal University, Zhuhai, China	2024
14	University of Texas, Austin, USA	2022
13	University of Pavia, Italy	2019
12	Australian National University, Canberra, Australia	2017
11	University of New Mexico, Albuquerque, USA	2015
10	Leipzig University, Germany	2013
9	Hong Kong, China	2011
8	University of California at Berkeley, USA	2009
7	Paris, France	2007
6	Padang, Indonesia	2005
5	University of Cagliari, Italy	2003
4	University of California at Santa Barbara, USA	2001
3	University of Amsterdam, the Netherlands	1999
2	University of Oregon, Eugene, USA	1997
1	University of the Basque Country, Vitoria-Gasteiz, Spain	1995

== Presidents ==
The following persons have been president of the Association for Linguistic Typology:

- Bernard Comrie 1995–1999
- Marianne Mithun 1999–2003
- Nicholas Evans 2003–2007
- Anna Siewierska 2007–2011
- Johanna Nichols 2011–2015
- Jeff Good 2016–2019
- Keren Rice 2020–2022
- Johan van der Auwera 2023–
