= Blemmyan language =

Early form of the Cushitic Beja language

Blemmyan
- Region: Eastern Desert and Lower Nubia (modern day Sudan and Egypt)
- Ethnicity: Blemmyes
- Extinct: Evolved into Beja
- Language family: Afro-Asiatic: Cushitic; North; Blemmyan
- Early form: Medjay
- Writing system: Coptic alphabet

Language codes
- ISO 639-3: –

Blemmyan, Blemmye, Old Beja or Old Bedauye is an extinct Afroasiatic language of the Cushitic branch that was spoken by the Blemmyes in the Eastern Desert. Its identification as an early form of Beja is generally accepted.

== Classification ==
Multiple researchers have proposed that the language of the Blemmyes was an ancestor of modern Beja. Francis Llewellyn Griffith identified the language of an ostracon discovered at Saqqara as "probably in the Blemmye language." Nubiologist Gerald M. Browne and linguist Klaus Wedekind have both attempted to demonstrate that this language is an ancestor of Beja, and were both of the opinion that it represented a fragment of Psalm 30.

The Egyptologist Helmut Satzinger has analyzed Blemmyan names from Egyptian, Greek, and Coptic sources, and similarly concluded that the Blemmyan language is an ancestor of Beja.

Meroiticist and archaeologist Claude Rilly concurs:

The Blemmyan language is so close to modern Beja that it is probably nothing else than an early dialect of the same language. In this case, the Blemmyes can be regarded as a particular tribe of the Medjay.
