= Hedareb people =

Hedareb
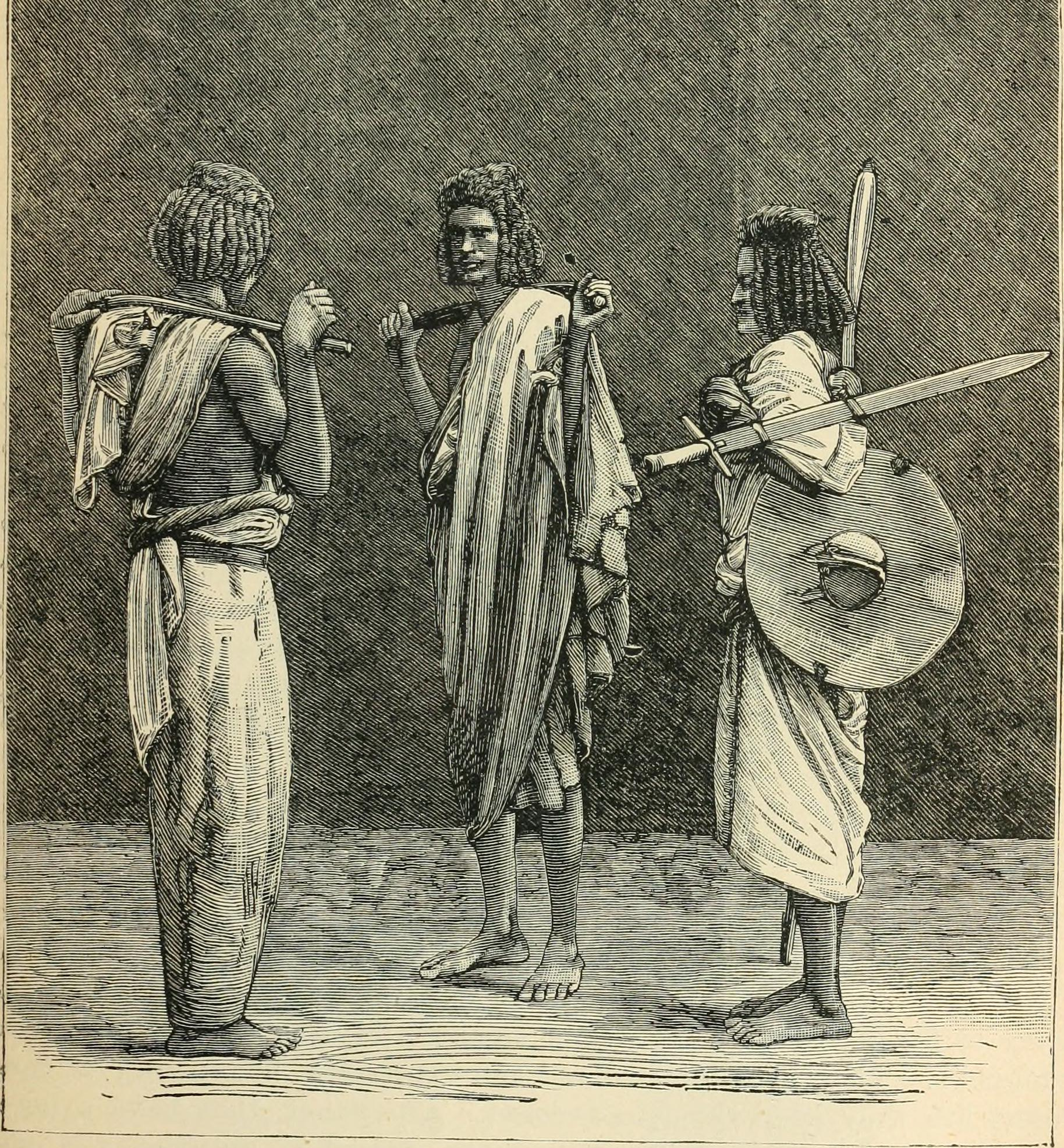
- An illustration of "Beni Amer" men, from 1888

Regions with significant populations
- Eritrea; 100,000–420,000

Languages
- Beja, Tigre, Arabic

Religion
- Sunni Islam

Related ethnic groups
- other Beja and other Cushitic peoples

The Hedareb or T'bdawe (Note: Hedareb, t'badwe, to-bedawye and bedawi may refer to the people or their language. Beja is an Arabic name for the language; Hedareb may be a corruption of Hadarma, "people of the Hadhramaut". See Tesfagiorgis G., Mussie (2010). Eritrea. p. 178 and 216. ISBN 9781598842319. and Paul, A. (1959). "THE HADĀREB: A Study in Arab—Beja Relationships". Sudan Notes and Records. 40. University of Khartoum: 75–78. JSTOR 41719580.) are a Cushitic ethnic group native to northwestern Eritrea. They are a subgroup of the Beja. They are more diverse than the other Eritrean ethnicities; one subgroup speaks the traditional Beja language, which belongs to the Cushitic branch of the Afro-Asiatic family, while another is more closely related to Sudanese Hadendoa. They are among the least-researched groups in Eritrea.

The Hedareb people live in northwestern Eritrea and extend as far as the borders with east Sudan. Nomadic or semi-nomadic pastoralists, they typically migrate seasonally with their herds of camels, goats and sheep.

== Language ==
The Hedareb speak the Beja language or Tigre language as a mother tongue. In addition to their variety of Beja, known as Hedareb or T’badwe, most Hedareb people also speak at least one other language, typically for a larger group Tigre, and for a small group Arabic as well.

== Society ==
Hedareb society is hierarchical, and is traditionally organized into clans and subclans. Hedarebs are a Muslim group, and most are Sunni Muslims. Marriages are typically arranged to maximize alliances between extended families. It is customary for the groom's family to pay a bride price of five to twelve goats, and a varying amount of money, or as much as 70 camels.

Sociologist Abdulkader Saleh Mohammad writes that the Hedareb have been excluded from state conceptions of Eritrean nationhood and have become a marginalized group with many members who do not feel connected to the Eritrean nation-state.

=== Laws ===
As Muslim people, the Hedareb follow Sharia law in most matters.

In the nineteenth century, blood feuds marked by chains of revenge killings existed among Hedareb groups; unlike those among neighboring groups, they were rarely resolved by the payment of blood money, possibly because the Hedareb had fewer trading practices. Also distinctively, killing one's wife was traditionally punished by death, while killing one's children went unpunished. Rape of a noblewoman by a serf was punishable by death, while rape of serfs by nobles was tolerated.

== See also ==
- Amarar tribe
- Bisharin tribe
