= Beja language =

Cushitic language of Northeast Africa

Beja
- Bidhaawyeet, Tubdhaawi, تُبڈاوِ
- Native to: Sudan, Eritrea, Egypt
- Region: Red Sea
- Ethnicity: Beja
- Native speakers: 2.76 million (2022–2023)
- Language family: Afro-Asiatic: Cushitic; North; Beja
- Early forms: Proto-Cushitic: Medjay; Blemmyan
- Dialects: Hadendoa; Hadareb; Amarar; Bisharin; Beni-Amer
- Writing system: Latin alphabet (limited use); Arabic alphabet (limited use)

Official status
- Recognised minority language in: Eritrea; Sudan

Language codes
- ISO 639-2: bej
- ISO 639-3: bej
- Glottolog: beja1238

Beja (Bidhaawyeet or Tubdhaawi) is an Afroasiatic language of the Cushitic branch spoken on the western coast of the Red Sea by the Beja people. Its speakers inhabit parts of Egypt, Sudan and Eritrea.

== Name ==
The name Beja, derived from Arabic: بجا, romanized: bijā, is most common in English-language literature. Native speakers use the term Bidhaawyeet (indefinite) or Tubdhaawi (definite).

== Geographical distribution ==
Beja is spoken by the Beja people in parts of Sudan, Eritrea & Egypt. In 2022 there were 2,550,000 Beja speakers in Sudan, and 121,000 Beja speakers in Eritrea according to Ethnologue. As of 2023 there are an estimated 88,000 Beja speakers in Egypt. The total number of speakers in all three countries is 2,759,000.

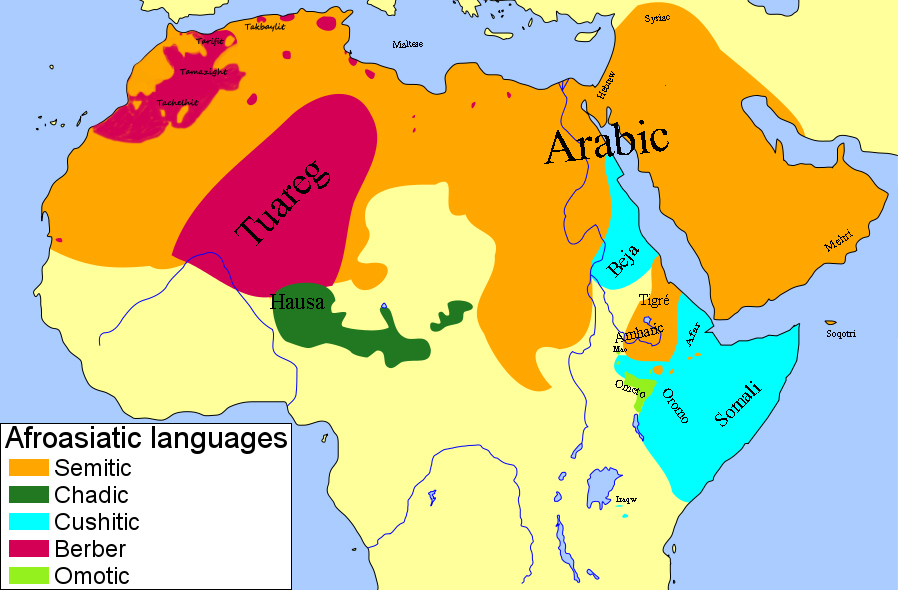
Geographical distribution of Afroasiatic languages. Beja speakers comprise the northernmost cyan zone, separated from the other Cushitic languages by Ethiosemitic speakers.

== Classification ==
Beja is held by most linguists to be part of the Cushitic branch of the Afroasiatic family, constituting the only member of the Northern Cushitic subgroup. As such, Beja contains a number of linguistic innovations that are unique to it, as is also the situation with the other subgroups of Cushitic (e.g. idiosyncratic features in Agaw or Central Cushitic). The characteristics of Beja that differ from those of other Cushitic languages are likewise generally acknowledged as normal branch variation.

The relation of the Northern Cushitic branch of Cushitic to the other branches is unknown. Christopher Ehret proposes, based on the devoicing of Proto-Cushitic voiced velar fricatives, that Northern Cushitic is possibly more closely related to South Cushitic than to the other branches.

The identification of Beja as an independent branch of Cushitic dates to the work of Enrico Cerulli between 1925 and 1951. Due to Beja's linguistic innovations, Robert Hetzron argued that it constituted an independent branch of Afroasiatic. Hetzron's proposal was generally rejected by other linguists, and Cerulli's identification of Beja as the sole member of a North Cushitic branch remains standard today across otherwise divergent proposals for the internal relations of the Cushitic language family.

== History ==
The ostracon which Francis Llewellyn Griffith believed bore writing in the Blemmyan language. Gerald M. Browne and Klaus Wedekind believe this to be the ancestor of the modern Beja language.

Christopher Ehret proposes the following sequence of sound changes between Proto-Cushitic and Beja:

1. PC *tsʼ → *cʼ (alveolar ejective affricate becomes palatal ejective stop)
2. PC *tʼ → *tsʼ (dental ejective stop becomes alveolar ejective affricate)
3. *Cʼ → C (ejectives become their non-ejective voiceless counterparts)
4. [+lateral/+obstruent] → [+retroflex/+obstruent] (that is, *dɮ and *tɬ become /ɖ/ and /ʈ/, respectively)
5. PC *dz → *ts (voiced alveolar affricate becomes voiceless)
6. *ts → s (voiceless alveolar affricate becomes a fricative);
  *c → ʃ (voiceless palatal plosive becomes a postalveolar fricative)
7. *p → b
8. PC *ɣʷ → *xʷ (labialized voiced velar fricative becomes voiceless)
9. *x⁽ʷ⁾ → *k⁽ʷ⁾ (velar fricatives become plosives)
10. PC *ɬ → r /V_V (lateral fricative becomes alveolar tap between vowels)
11. PC *ɬ → l /#_ (lateral fricative becomes lateral approximant word-initially)
12. PC *z → j /V_ (a consonant of unknown value becomes palatal approximant after vowels)
13. PC *z → d /#_ (the same consonant of unknown value becomes voiced alveolar stop word-initially)
14. PC *ŋ, *ɲ → n (all nasals but /m/ collapse into alveolar nasal)

Ehret's reconstructed Proto-Cushitic *z is not a voiced alveolar fricative, but a consonant of unknown value. Ehret proposes that it might be a voiced palatal plosive /ɟ/.

Some linguists and paleographers believe that they have uncovered evidence of an earlier stage of Beja, referred to in different publications as "Old Bedauye" or "Old Beja." Helmut Satzinger has identified the names found on several third century CE ostraca (potsherds) from the Eastern Desert as likely Blemmyan, representing a form of Old Beja. He also identifies several epigraphic texts from the fifth and sixth centuries as representing a later form of the same language. Nubiologist Gerald Browne, Egyptologist Helmut Satzinger, and Cushiticist Klaus Wedekind believed that an ostracon discovered in a monastery in Saqqarah also represents the Old Beja language. Browne and Wedekind identified the text as a translation of Psalm 30.

== Phonology ==
Consonants
		Labial	Dental/ Alveolar	Retroflex	Palatal	Velar		Glottal
		Labial	Dental/ Alveolar	Retroflex	Palatal	plain	labialized	Glottal
Nasal		m	n	(ɳ)	(ɲ)	(ŋ)		
Plosive	voiceless		t	ʈ		k	kʷ	ʔ
Plosive	voiced	b	d	ɖ	ʤ	ɡ	ɡʷ	
Fricative	voiceless	f	s		ʃ	(x)		h
Fricative	voiced		(z)			(ɣ)		
Trill			r					
Approximant		w	l		j			

Nasals other than /m/ and /n/ are positional variants of /n/. The consonants /χ/ and /ɣ/ only appear in Arabic loanwords in some speakers' speech; in others', they are replaced by /k/ or /h/ and /g/. Some speakers replace /z/ in Arabic loanwords with /d/.

Beja has the five vowels /a/, /e/, /i/, /o/, and /u/. /e/ and /o/ only appear long, while /a/, /i/, and /u/ have long and short variants.

	Front	Central	Back
Close	i iː		u uː
Mid	eː		oː
Open		a aː	

Beja has pitch accent.

== Orthography ==
Both Roman and Arabic script have been used to write Beja. The Roman orthography below is that used by the Eritrean government and was used in a literacy program at Red Sea University in Port Sudan from 2010 to 2013. Three Arabic orthographies have seen limited use: The first below was that used by the now defunct Website Sakanab; the second was devised by Muhammad Adaroob Muhammad and used in his translation of E.M. Roper's Beja lexicon; the third was devised by Mahmud Ahmad Abu Bikr Ooriib, and was employed briefly at Red Sea University in 2019. No system of writing has gained wide support. The only system to have been employed in publications by more than one writer is the Latin script.

Beja Orthographies
IPA	Roman	Arabic (Usakana)	Arabic (MHM)	Arabic (RSU)
ʔ	'	ء		
b	b	ب		
d	d	د		
ɖ	dh	ﮈ	ذ	ݚ
f	f	ف		
g	g	ق		گ
ɣ	gh	غ	—N/a	
gʷ	gw	قْو		گْو
h	h	ه		
ʤ	j	ج		
k	k	ك		
kʷ	kw	كْو		
l	l	ل		
m	m	م		
n	n	ن		
r	r	ر		
s	s	س		
ʃ	sh	ش		
t	t	ت		
ʈ	th	ﭦ	ث	—N/a
w	w	و		
x	kh	خ	—N/a	
j	y	ي		

In the Roman orthography, the vowels are written with the letters corresponding to the IPA symbols (i.e., ⟨a, e, i, o, u⟩). Long vowels are written with doubled signs. As /e/ and /o/ cannot be short vowels, they only appear as ⟨ee⟩ and ⟨oo⟩, respectively.

The single ⟨e⟩ sign, however, does have a use: To distinguish between /ɖ/ and /dh/, ⟨dh⟩ is used for the former and ⟨deh⟩ for the latter. Similarly, ⟨keh⟩ is /kh/, ⟨teh⟩ is /th/, ⟨seh⟩ is /sh/. Single ⟨o⟩ is not used.

In all Arabic orthographies, short vowels are written with the same diacritics used in Arabic: fatḥah for /a/ (ـَ), kasrah for /i/ (ـِ), ḍammah for /u/ (ـُ). 'Alif (ا) is used as the seat for these diacritics at the beginning of a word. Long /aː/ is written with 'alif (ا) preceded by fatḥah, or alif maddah (آ) when word-initial. Long /iː/ is written with yā' ي preceded by kasrah. Long /uː/ is written with wāw و preceded by ḍammah. The systems vary on the representation of long /eː/ and long /oː/. In the Usakana system, /eː/ is written with a modified Kurdish yā' ێ; in the system devised by Muhammad Adaroob Muhammad it is represented by yā' with a shaddah يّ; in the Red Sea University system, it is not distinguished from the yā' for /j/ or /iː/. In the Usakana system, /oː/ is written with a modified Kurdish wāw ۆ; in the system devised by Muhammad Adaroob Muhammad it is represented by wāw with a shaddah وّ; in the Red Sea University system, it is not distinguished from the wāw for /w/ or /uː/.

Pitch accent is not marked in any orthography. In Wedekind, Wedekind, and Musa (2006 and 2007), stressed syllables are indicated in boldface.

In addition to these two systems and several academic systems of transcribing Beja texts, it is possible that Beja was at least occasionally written in the Greek alphabet-based Coptic script during the Middle Ages.

== Grammar ==
=== Nouns, articles, and adjectives ===
Beja nouns and adjectives have two genders: masculine and feminine, two numbers: singular and plural, two cases: nominative and oblique, and may be definite, indefinite, or in construct state. Gender, case, and definiteness are not marked on the noun itself, but on clitics and affixes. Singular-plural pairs in Beja are unpredictable.

==== Plural forms ====
Plurals may be formed by:

- the addition of a suffix -a to the singular stem: gaw 'house', gawaab 'houses' (the final -b is an indefinite suffix)
- the shortening of the final syllable of the singular stem (or Ablaut in this syllable): kaam 'camel', kam 'camels'
- shift of the accent from the ultimate to the penultimate syllable: hadhaab /haˈɖaːb/ 'lion', hadhaab /ˈhaɖaːb/ 'lions' (orthographically identical)
- a combination of these.

A small number of nouns do not distinguish between singular and plural forms. Some nouns are always plural. A few nouns have suppletive plurals.

==== Case and definiteness ====
A noun may be prefixed by a clitic definite article, or have an indefinite suffix. Definite articles indicate gender, number, and case. The indefinite suffix marks gender only, and does not appear in the nominative case. For feminine common nouns, the indefinite suffix is -t; for masculine nouns and feminine proper nouns, -b. The indefinite suffixes only appear after vowels. The definite article is proclitic. It has the following forms with masculine monosyllabic nouns that do not begin with /h/ or /ʔ/ (note that an initial glottal stop is usually omitted in writing, and that all words that appear to be vowel-initial actually begin with a glottal stop):

	Nominative	Oblique
Singular	uu-	oo-
Plural	aa-	ee-

The feminine definite articles begin with ⟨t⟩ but are otherwise identical (tuu-, too-, taa-, tee-). With nouns longer than one syllable and with nouns that begin with /h/ or /ʔ/, reduced forms of the definite article are used which do not distinguish between cases, but maintain gender distinctions. In some dialects (e.g. that described by Wedekind, Wedekind, and Musa for Port Sudan) the reduced forms maintain number distinctions; in others (e.g. that described by Vanhove and Roper for Sinkat) they do not.

==== Possession ====
Possessive relationships are shown through a genitive suffix -ii (singular possessed) or -ee (plural possessed) which attaches to the possessing noun. If the possessing noun is feminine, the genitive marker will begin with t; if the possessed is feminine, the suffix will end with t. When the suffix does not end with the feminine marker t, it reduces to -(t)i, whether singular or plural (that is, the singular/plural distinction is only marked for feminine possessa). Because this suffix adds a syllable to the noun, full forms of articles cannot be used; thus, the article on the noun itself does not indicate case. However, agreeing adjectives will be marked for oblique case. No article or indefinite suffix may be applied to the possessed noun. The possessed noun follows the possessor. Examples:

- utaki raaw 'the man's friend (m)'
- utakiit raaw 'the man's friend (f)'
- tutakatti raaw 'the woman's friend (m)'
- tutakattiit raaw 'the woman's friend (f)'
- indaayeet raw 'the men's friends (f)'

(The noun tak 'man' has the suppletive plural (n)da 'men'; raaw 'friend' has the shortened plural raw 'friends'.)

Postpositions follow nouns in the genitive. Examples:

- Whad'aay**iida** uutak eeya. 'The man came toward the chief/elder.' (-da: 'toward')
- W'oor t'aritt**i geeb** eefi 'The boy is with the girls.' (geeb: 'with')

==== Adjectives ====
Adjectives follow the nominal heads of noun phrases. They agree in gender, number, case, and definiteness, and carry case and definiteness markers of the same form as nouns.

=== Copula ===
Clauses may be composed of two noun phrases or a noun phrase and a predicative adjective followed by a copular clitic. The copula agrees in person, gender, and number with the copula complement (the second term), but the first- and third-person forms are identical. The copular subject will be in the nominative case, the copular complement in the oblique. Oblique -b becomes -w before -wa. Copular complements that end in a vowel will employ an epenthetic y between the final vowel and any vowel-initial copular clitic.

		Masculine	Feminine
1st person	singular	-u	-tu
1st person	plural	-a	-ta
2nd person	singular	-wa	-tuwi
2nd person	plural	-aana	-taana
3rd person	singular	-u	-tu
3rd person	plural	-a	-ta

Examples:

- Ani akraabu. "I am strong."
- Baruuk akraawwa. "You are strong."
- Baruuh hadhaabu. "He is a lion."
- Tuun ay-girshaytu. "This is a five-piastre piece."
- Hinin Imeeraaba. "We are Amirab."
- Baraah imaka. "They are the donkeys."
- Baraah igwharaaya. "They are the thieves."

=== Verbs ===
Beja verbs have two different types, first noted by Almkvist: "strong verbs," which conjugate with both prefixes and suffixes and have several principal parts; and "weak verbs," which conjugate with suffixes only and which have a fixed root. Verbs conjugate for a number of tense, aspect, modality, and polarity variations, which have been given different names by different linguists:

Roper	Wedekind, Wedekind, and Musa	Vanhove
Conditional	Past Continuous	Aorist
Past Indicative	Past	Perfective
Present Indicative	Present	Imperfective
Future Indicative	Future	Future
—N/a	Intentional	Desiderative
Imperative	Imperative	Imperative
Optative	Jussive	Optative
—N/a	Jussive	Potential

(Roper analyzes additional subjunctive forms where Wedekind, Wedekind, and Musa, and Vanhove see a conditional particle.)

Each of the above forms has a corresponding negative. (Vanhove refers to the imperative negative as the "prohibitive".) The past continuous and past share a past negative. Negative forms are not derived from corresponding positive forms, but are independent conjugations.

Every verb has a corresponding deverbal noun, which Wedekind, Wedekind, and Musa refer to as a "noun of action", Vanhove calls an "action noun", and Roper a "nomen actionis". Numerous serial verb constructions exist which connote different aspectual and potential meanings.

==== Imperative ====
The third person masculine singular positive imperative is the citation form of the verb. Weak verbs have a long final suffix -aa while strong verbs have a short final suffix -a. For both weak and strong verbs, the negative imperative is formed by an identical set of prefixes baa- (for masculine singular and common plural) and bii- (for feminine singular). Strong verbs use a negative imperative root which has a lengthened vowel.

Weak Verb: giigaa "go away"
	Positive	Negative
2SG.M	giig-aa	baa-giig-aa
2SG.F	giig-ii	bii-giig-ii
2PL	giig-aana	baa-giig-aana

Strong Verb: fidiga "open"
	Positive	Negative
2SG.M	fidig-a	baa-fidiig-a
2SG.F	fidig-i	bii-fidiig-i
2PL	fidig-na	baa-fidiig-na

==== Deverbal and dependent forms ====
===== Deverbal noun =====
Every Beja verb has a corresponding deverbal noun (Wedekind, Wedekind, and Musa: "noun of action"; Vanhove: "action noun"; Roper: "nomen actionis"). For weak verbs, the deverbal noun is formed by a suffix -ti attached to the imperative root (see above). For strong verbs, deverbal nouns are not entirely predictable.

Examples:

- Weak verbs: diwaa "to sleep" → diwtiib "sleeping"; afooyaa "to forgive" → afootiib "forgiving"
- Strong verbs: adhidha "to hobble" → adhuudh "hobbling"; nikwiyi "to be pregnant" → nakwiit "being pregnant"

There are patterns in strong verb deverbal nouns related to the structure of the citation form of the verb. However, these are not consistent.

===== Deverbal adjective =====
A further derived form is a suffix -aa attached to the citation root, and then followed by -b for masculine nouns and -t for feminine. Examples:

Citation Form	Masculine	Feminine	Meaning
diwaa	diw-aab	diw-aat	asleep
afooyaa	afooy-aab	afooy-aat	forgiven
adhidha	adhidh-aab	adhidh-aat	hobbled
nikwiyi	—N/a	nikwiy-aat	pregnant

This form may be used as an adjective, but it is also employed in the construction of multiple conjugated negative forms. Wedekind, Wedekind, and Musa analyse this form as a participle. Martine Vanhove analyses it as a manner converb -a.

==== Tense-conjugated forms ====
===== Past continuous/aorist =====
The past continuous stem for strong verbs is not derivable from any other verb stem. The negative of the past continuous is identical to that of the past: There is only one past tense negative form. For both weak and strong verbs, the past negative is formed through a deverbal participial or converbal form (see above) followed by the present negative of the irregular verb aka "to be".

Wedekind, Wedekind, and Musa describe the past continuous as being used for "habitual, repeated actions of the (more distant) past." It is the verb conjugation used for counterfactual conditionals, which leads to Roper's identifying this tense as the "conditional". It is also frequently used in narratives.

Weak Verb: giigaa "go away"
	Positive	Negative
1SG	giig-i	giig-aab kaaki
2SG.M	giig-tiya	giig-aab kittaa
2SG.F	giig-tiyi	giig-aat kittaayi
3SG.M	giig-i	giig-aab kiiki
3SG.F	giig-ti	giig-aat kitti
1PL	giig-ni	giig-aab kinki
2PL	giig-tiina	giig-aab kitteena
3PL	giig-iin	giig-aab kiikeen

Strong Verb: fidiga "open"
	Positive	Negative
1SG	iifdig	fidg-aab kaaki
2SG.M	t-iifdig-a	fidg-aab kittaa
2SG.F	t-iifdig-i	fidg-aat kittaayi
3SG.M	iifdig	fidg-aab kiiki
3SG.F	t-iifdig	fidg-aab kitti
1PL	n-iifdig	fidg-aab kinki
2PL	t-iifdig-na	fidg-aab kitteena
3PL	iifdig-na	fidg-aab kiikeen

===== Past/perfective =====
The past or perfective stem for strong verbs is identical to the citation form (imperative) stem, with predictable phonetic modifications. The negative is identical to that of the past continuous/aorist (above).

Weak verb: giigaa "go away"
	Positive	Negative
1SG	giig-an	giig-aab kaaki
2SG.M	giig-taa	giig-aab kittaa
2SG.F	giig-taayi	giig-aat kittaayi
3SG.M	giig-iya	giig-aab kiiki
3SG.F	giig-ta	giig-aat kitti
1PL	giig-na	giig-aab kinki
2PL	giig-taana	giig-aab kitteena
3PL	giig-iyaan	giig-aab kiikeen

Strong verb: fidiga "open"
	Positive	Negative
1SG	a-fdig	fidg-aab kaaki
2SG.M	ti-fdig-a	fidg-aab kittaa
2SG.F	ti-fdig-i	fidg-aat kittaayi
3SG.M	i-fdig	fidg-aab kiiki
3SG.F	ti-fdig	fidg-aab kitti
1PL	ni-fdig	fidg-aab kinki
2PL	ti-fdig-na	fidg-aab kitteena
3PL	i-fdig-na	fidg-aab kiikeen

===== Present/imperfective =====
The present or imperfective has two stems for positive strong verbs, while the negative strong stem is identical to that used for the imperative (and thus also for past/perfective verbs). Weak negative verbs add the prefix ka- to positive past/perfective forms.

Weak verb: giigaa "go away"
	Positive	Negative
1SG	giig-ani	ka-giig-an
2SG.M	giig-tiniya	ka-giig-taa
2SG.F	giig-tinii	ka-giig-taayi
3SG.M	giig-inii	ka-giig-iya
3SG.F	giig-tini	ka-giig-ta
1PL	giig-nay	ka-giig-na
2PL	giig-teena	ka-giig-taana
3PL	giig-een	ka-giig-iyaan

Strong verb: fidiga "open"
	Positive	Negative
1SG	a-fandiig	kaa-fdig
2SG.M	fandiig-a	kit-fidig-a
2SG.F	fandiig-i	kit-fidig-i
3SG.M	fandiig	kii-fdig
3SG.F	fandiig	kit-fidig
1PL	ni-fadig	kin-fdig
2PL	ti-fadig-na	kit-fidig-na
3PL	i-fadig-na	kii-fdig-na

===== Future =====
The strong future stem is described differently by Wedekind, Wedekind, and Musa and by Vanhove. Both agree that it is a fixed stem followed by a present/imperfective conjugated form of the verb diya "to say." Wedekind, Wedekind, and Musa's strong stem is similar to the past continuous/aorist stem (next section), and identical for all numbers, genders, and persons, except the first person plural, which has a prefixed n-. For Vanhove, there are distinct singular and plural stems which are identical to the past continuous/aorist first person singular and plural, respectively. Similarly, for weak verbs, Wedekind, Wedekind, and Musa have a future stem ending in -i with a first person plural -ni, followed by a present tense/imperfective conjugation of diya. Vanhove sees the -i as a singular future, and the -ni as a general plural. For negative verbs, the negative present/imperfective of diya is used as the conjugated auxiliary.

Weak Verb: giigaa "go away"
	Positive	Negative
1SG	giig-i andi	giig-i kaadi
2SG.M	giig-i tindiya	giig-i kiddiya
2SG.F	giig-i tindii	giig-i kiddiyi
3SG.M	giig-i indi	giig-i kiidi
3SG.F	giig-i tindi	giig-i kiddi
1PL	giig-ni neeyad	giig-ni kindi
2PL	giig-i teeyadna (Vanhove: giig-ni teeyadna)	giig-i kiddiina (Vanhove: giig-ni kiddiina)
3PL	giig-i eeyadna (Vanhove: giig-ni eeyadna)	giig-i kiidiin (Vanhove: giig-ni kiidiin)

Strong Verb: fidiga "open"
	Positive	Negative
1SG	iifdig andi	iifdig kaadi
2SG.M	iifdig tindiya	iifdig kiddiya
2SG.F	iifdig tindii	iifdig kiddiyi
3SG.M	iifdig indi	iifdig kiidi
3SG.F	iifdig tindi	iifdig kiddi
1PL	niifdig neeyad	niifdig kindi
2PL	iifdig teeyadna (Vanhove: niifdig teeyadna)	iifdig kiddiina (Vanhove: niifdig kiddiina)
3PL	iifdig eeyadna (Vanhove: niifdig eeyadna)	iifdig kiidiin (Vanhove: niifdig kiidiin)

(NB: Wedekind, Wedekind, and Musa see verbs of the form CiCiC as having identical past continuous [aorist] and future stems. Some verbs of other forms have different stems, which would lead to a greater divergence between the forms described by them and those described by Vanhove.) E.M. Roper, describing the same dialect as Vanhove, identifies the stem employed as being identical to the past continuous/aorist (for him, "conditional"—see above), just as Vanhove does. However, he understands the form with n- as being used only with the first person plural, as Wedekind, Wedekind, and Musa do.

====== Intentional/desiderative ======
In addition to the future, Bidhaawyeet has a similar form expressing desire to undertake an act or intention to do so. The citation root takes a suffix -a for all persons, genders, and numbers, and is followed by a present tense/imperfective conjugated form of the verb diya "to say", as the future is.

==== Jussive, optative, potential ====
There is distinct disagreement between the major grammars of the past century on the modal conjugation or conjugations referred to as "jussive," "optative," and "potential."

Wedekind, Wedekind, and Musa describe a "jussive" with the following paradigm. For strong verbs, the first person is based on the past/perfective stem, and the persons are based on the future stem; no negative jussive is given:

Weak verb: giigaa "go away"
	Positive
1SG	giig-atay
2SG.M	giig-ata
2SG.F	giig-ati
3SG.M	ba-giig-iiyay
3SG.F	ba-giig-tiyay
1PL	giig-niiyay
2PL	giig-aana
3PL	ba-giig-iinay

Strong verb: fidiga "open"
	Positive
1SG	fidg-atay
2SG.M	fidg-ata
2SG.F	fidg-ati
3SG.M	ba'-iifidig-ay
3SG.F	bat-iifidig-ay
1PL	niifdig-ay
2PL	—N/a
3PL	ba-'iifdig-naay

They give various examples of the jussive with translations into English, in order to give a sense of the meaning:

- Araatatay! "Let me ask!"
- Naan **gw'ata**? "What **would you (m) like to drink**?"
- Hindeeh **nihiriway**! "Please **let us look for it**!" (Atmaan dialect)

Vanhove identifies a complex "potential" form composed of a nominalizing suffix -at followed by a present/imperfective reduced conjugation of the verb m'a 'come' (eeya in the non-reduced present/imperfective).

Weak verb: giigaa "go away"
	Positive
1SG	giig-at
2SG.M	giig-at-a
2SG.F	giig-at-i
3SG.M	giig-at eeyini
3SG.F	giig-at eetnii
1PL	giig-at eenay
2PL	giig-at-na
3PL	giig-at een

Strong verb: fidiga "open"
	Positive
1SG	fidg-at
2SG.M	fidg-at-a
2SG.F	fidg-at-i
3SG.M	fidg-at eeyini
3SG.F	fidg-at eetnii
1PL	fidg-at eenay
2PL	fidg-at-na
3PL	fidg-at een

Vanhove describes the potential as expressing "epistemic modalities of inference or near-certainty." Examples below, with the potential verbs in bold:

- "Deeyaraneek kaakan dabal had **fiinataay**," indi een. "'I am really exhausted, so **I should rest** a while,' he says."

Additionally, she recognizes an optative with positive and negative polarity. The positive optative is formed from a prefix baa- to the past continuous/aorist. The negative construction is more complex. In some dialects, the final -aay of most forms of the weak negative is a short -ay:

Weak verb: giigaa "go away"
	Positive	Negative
1SG	baa-giig-i	baa-giig-aay
2SG.M	baa-giig-tiya	bit-giig-aay
2SG.F	baa-giig-tiyi	bit-giig-aay
3SG.M	baa-giig-i	bii-giig-aay
3SG.F	baa-giig-ti	bit-giig-aay
1PL	baa-giig-ni	bin-giig-aay
2PL	baa-giig-tiina	bit-giig-eena
3PL	baa-giig-iin	bii-giig-eena

Strong verb: fidiga "open"
	Positive	Negative
1SG	baa-'iifdig	baa-fdig
2SG.M	baa-t-iifdig-a	bit-fdig-a
2SG.F	baa-t-iifdig-i	bit-fdig-i
3SG.M	baa-'iifdig	bii-fdig
3SG.F	baa-t-iifdig	bit-fdig
1PL	baa-n-iifdig	bin-fdig
2PL	baa-t-iifdig-na	bit-fdig-na
3PL	baa-'iifdig-na	bii-fdig-na

Vanhove gives no explanation for the use of the optative positive. The optative negative is used in conditional clauses with meanings of incapacity and necessity:

- "Har'iisii **bity'aheebaay**," ani. "'**Don't let it come** from behind me!' I told myself."
- Naat **bitkatiim** mhiin uumeek ingad. "The donkey stopped in a place where nothing **can arrive**."
- Dhaabi **biidii**yeeb hiisan. "I thought **he would not be able to run**."
- Yaa iraanaay, ooyhaam thab'a! **Baakwinhaay** akaabuuyit... "Oh, man, hit the leopard! **I don't need to shout** at you and…"

== Lexicon ==
Through lexicostatistical analysis, David Cohen (1988) observed that Beja shared a basic vocabulary of around 20% with the East Cushitic Afar and Somali languages and the Central Cushitic Agaw languages, which are among its most geographically near Afroasiatic languages. This was analogous to the percentage of common lexical terms that was calculated for certain other Cushitic languages, such as Afar and Oromo. Václav Blažek (1997) conducted a more comprehensive glottochronological examination of languages and data. He identified a markedly close ratio of 40% cognates between Beja and Proto-East Cushitic as well as a cognate percentage of approximately 20% between Beja and Central Cushitic, similar to that found by Cohen.

A fairly large portion of Beja vocabulary is borrowed from Arabic. In Eritrea and Sudan, some terms are instead Tigre loanwords. Andrzej Zaborski has noted close parallels between Beja and Egyptian vocabulary.

The only independent Beja dictionary yet printed is Leo Reinisch's 1895 Wörterbuch der Beḍauye-Sprache. An extensive vocabulary forms an appendix to E.M. Roper's 1928 Tu Beḍawiɛ: An Elementary Handbook for the use of Sudan Government Officials, and this has formed the basis for much recent comparative Cushitic work. Klaus and Charlotte Wedekind and Abuzeinab Musa's 2007 A Learner's Grammar of Beja (East Sudan) comes with a CD which contains a roughly 7,000-word lexicon, composed mostly of one-word glosses. Klaus Wedekind, Abuzeinab Muhammed, Feki Mahamed, and Mohamed Talib were working on a Beja-Arabic-English dictionary, but publication appears to have been stalled by Wedekind's death. Martine Vanhove announced a forthcoming Beja-Arabic-English-French dictionary in 2006. It has not yet been published. The Beja scholar Muhammed Adarob Ohaj produced a Beja-Arabic dictionary as his masters thesis in 1972. It has not yet been published.

=== Swadesh list ===
The following list is drawn from Wedekind, Wedekind, and Musa's 2007 grammar and Roper's 1928 handbook. Nouns are given in indefinite accusative forms (the citation form); unless marked otherwise, forms that end in ⟨t⟩ are feminine and all others are masculine. Verbs are given in the singular masculine imperative.

No.	English	Beja Bidhaawyeet
1	I	aneeb (acc), ani (nom)
2	you (singular)	barook (m.acc), batook (f.acc), baruuk (m.nom), batuuk (f.nom)
3	we	hinin
4	this	oon- (m.acc), toon- (f.acc), uun- (m.nom), tuun- (f.nom)
5	that	been
6	who	aab (acc), aaw (nom)
7	what	naa
8	not	—
9	all	kass-
10	many	gwidaab
11	one	gaal (m), gaat (f)
12	two	maloob
13	big	win
14	long	saraaraab
15	small	dibiloob
16	woman	takat
17	man (adult male)	tak
18	man (human being)	m'aadamiib
19	bird	kilaay (s), kilay (p)
20	dog	yaas (s), yas (p)
21	louse	taat (s), tat (p)
22	tree	hindiib (s/p)
23	seed	teeraab (s/p)
24	leaf	raat (s), rat (p)
25	root	gadam (s), gadamaab (p)
26	bark (of a tree)	adhift (s), adhifaat (p); hindi shadhiidh
27	skin	adeeb
28	meat	shaat
29	blood	booy
30	bone	miitaatt (s), miitatt (p)
31	fat (noun)	l'aab; dhhaab
32	fire	n'eet
33	egg	kwhiib
34	horn	d'aab
35	tail	niiwaat
36	feather	tambaat/timbaat
37	fish	ashoob
38	hair	hamoot
39	head	girmaab
40	ear	angwiil (s), angwil (p)
41	eye	liiliit; gw'aj
42	fingernail	n'af
43	nose	ginuuf (s), ginif (p)
44	mouth	yaf (s), yafaab (p)
45	tooth	kwiriib
46	tongue (organ)	miid(al)aab (s), miid(al)ab (p)
47	foot	ragad (s), ragadaab (p)
48	knee	gindhif/gindif (s), gindhifaab/gindifaab (p)
49	hand	ayeeb
50	belly	f'iib
51	neck	alaat
52	breast	nigw
53	heart (organ)	gin'aab
54	liver	seet
55	to drink	gw'a
56	to eat	tamaa
57	to bite	finika
58	to see	rhaa
59	to hear	maasiwa
60	to know	kana
61	to sleep	diwaa
62	to die	yaya
63	to kill	dira
64	to swim	nidabaa
65	to fly	firaa
66	to walk	hiireeraa
67	to come	m'aa
68	to lie (as in a bed)	b'iya
69	to sit	sa'a; thathaa
70	to stand	gada
71	to give	hiya
72	to say	diya
73	sun	yint
74	moon	tirigt
75	star	hayiikw
76	water	yam
77	rain	bireeb
78	stone	aweeb
79	sand	isseet
80	earth	burt; haash
81	cloud	baal (f.s), baalaat (p); sahaab
82	smoke	eegaab
83	ashes	n'eetehaash
84	to burn	liwa (tr), lawa (intr)
85	road	darab
86	mountain	ribaab
87	red	adaroob
88	green	sootaay
89	yellow	—
90	white	eeraab
91	black	hadal
92	night	hawaad (s), hawad (p)
93	warm	naba'
94	cold	m'akwaraab; l'aab
95	full	ataab
96	new	gayiib
97	good	daayiib
98	round	kwadhaadh; kwalaal
99	dry	balamaab
100	name	sim

1. Beja handles negation through distinct negative polarity conjugation. There is no lexical "not."
2. In some dialects liiliit means "pupil."
3. Ragad refers to the foot and leg.
4. This is a rare suppletive imperative. Other forms of the verb have no /m/ and are constructed around a consonantal root /j/.
5. Sootaay covers the blue-green range.

=== Numbers ===
	1	2	3	4	5	6	7	8	9	10
m	gaal	maloob	mhay	fadhig	ay	asagwir	asaramaab	asumhay	ashshadhig	tamin
f	gaat	maloot	mhayt	fadhigt	ayt	asagwitt	asaramaat	asumhayt	ashshadhigt	tamint

"Ten" has combining forms for the production of teens and products of ten. Numbers from 11 to 19 are formed by tamna- followed by the units. E.g., "fourteen" is tamna fadhig. Combining ones use the form -gwir; e.g., "eleven" is tamnagwir. "Twenty" is tagwuugw. "Twenty-one" is tagwgwagwir. "Thirty" is mhay tamun; "forty" is fadhig tamun; "fifty" is ay tamun; etc. "One hundred" is sheeb. For higher numbers, Beja-speakers use Arabic terms.

Ordinal numbers are formed by the addition of a suffix -a. "First" is awwal, borrowed from Arabic.

"Half" is tarab. Other fractions are borrowed from Arabic.

== Literature ==
Beja has an extensive oral tradition, including multiple poetic genres. A well-known epic is the story of the hero Mhamuud Oofaash, portions of which have appeared in various publications by Klaus Wedekind. An edition appears in Mahmud Mohammed Ahmed's Oomraay, published in Asmara. In the 1960s and '70s, the Beja intellectual Muhammed Adarob Ohaj collected oral recordings of poetic and narrative material which are in the University of Khartoum Institute of African and Asian Studies Sound Archives. Didier Morin and Mohamed-Tahir Hamid Ahmed have used these, in addition to their own collections, for multiple academic publications in French on Beja poetics. Red Sea University and the NGO Uhaashoon worked with oral story-tellers to produce a collection of 41 short readers and a longer collection of three short stories in Beja between 2010 and 2013.

== Sources ==
- Almkvist, Herman (1881). Die Bischari-Sprache Tū-Beḍāwie in Nordost-Afrika. Upsala: Akademisch Buchdruckerei.
- Appleyard, David (2007). "Beja Morphology". In Kaye, Alan S. (ed.). Morphologies of Asia and Africa. Winona Lake, Ind.: Eisenbrauns. pp. 447–479. ISBN 978-1-57506-109-2.
- Browne, Gerald (2003). Textus blemmyicus in aetatis christianae. Champaign, Illinois: Stipes Publish L.L.C. ISBN 978-1-58874-275-9.
- Ehret, Christopher (2008). "The primary branches of Cushitic: Seriating the diagnostic sound change rules". In Bengston, John (ed.). In Hot Pursuit of Language in Prehistory: Essays in the four fields of anthroplogy. Amsterdam: John Benjamins Publishing Company. pp. 149–160. ISBN 9789027232526.
- Hamid Ahmed, Mohamed-Tahir (2010). "L'Espace et la poésie bedja (Soudan)". Journal des Africanistes. 79 (2): 171–187.
- Hetzron, Robert (1980). "The Limits of Cushitic". SUGIA. 2: 7–125.
- Lamberti, Marcello (1991). "Cushitic and Its Classifications". Anthropos. 86 (4/6): 552–561.
- أوريب, مهمود واحمد ابوبكر (2019). تِگْرايَاوَ إِسَوادِيتْ كَنَانْ إِكُوَرانِي هَرْفيِ. Port Sudan: Red Sea University.
- محمد, محمد أدروب. قاموس بِذاوِيّت/عربي. Port Sudan.
- Mohammed Ahmed, Mahmud (2004). Oomraay. Asmara: Semhar Press.
- Reinisch, Leo (1893). Die Beḍauye-Sprache in Nordost-Afrika. Wien: Kaiserlich Akademie der Wissenschaften.
- Roper, E.M. (1927). "The Poetry of the Haḍenḍiwa". Sudan Notes and Records. 10: 147–158.
- Roper, E.M. (1928). Tu Beḍawiɛ: An Elementary Handbook for the Use of Sudan Government Officials. Hertford: Stephen Austin and Sons, Ltd.
- Satzinger, Helmut (2014). "The Barbarian Names on the Ostraca from the Eastern Desert (3rd Century CE)". Inside and Out. Interactions between Rome and the Peoples on the Arabian and Egyptian Frontiers in Late Antiquity. LAHR. pp. 199–212. ISBN 978-90-429-3124-4.
- Swackhamer, Jeanette. "Dabaab". Bidhaawyeetiit Kitaabaati Kitab.
- Swackhamer, Jeanette (2013). "Ooktaab Oowin". Bidhaawyeetiit Kitaabaati Kitab.
- Tosco, Mauro (2000). "Cushitic Overview". Journal of Ethiopian Studies. 33 (2): 87–121.
- Vanhove, Martine (2011). "Towards a semantic map of the Optative in Beja (North-Cushitic)". In Busetto, Luca; Sottile, Roberto; Tonelli, Livia; Tosco, Mauro (eds.). He bitaney lagge. Dedicato a / Dedicated to Marcello Lamberti. Saggi di Linguistica e Africanistica. Essays in Linguistics and African Studies. pp. 231–246.
- Vanhove, Martine (2006). "The Beja Language Today in Sudan: The State of the Art in Linguistics". Proceedings of the 7th International Sudan Studies Conference April 6 – 8 2006. University of Bergen.
- Vanhove, Martine (2014). "Beja Grammatical Sketch". The CorpAfroAs Corpus of Spoken AfroAsiatic Languages. doi:10.1075/scl.68.website.
- Vanhove, Martine (2017). Le Bedja. Leuven: Peeters. ISBN 978-9042935167.
- Vanhove, Martine (2020a). "North-Cushitic". In Vossen, Rainer; Dimmendaal, Gerrit J. (eds.). The Oxford Handbook of African Languages (PDF). Oxford University Press. pp. 300–307. doi:10.1093/oxfordhb/9780199609895.013.63. ISBN 9780199609895.
- Vanhove, Martine (2020b). "Beja". In Lucas, Christopher; Manfredi, Stefano (eds.). Arabic and contact-induced change. Berlin: Language Science Press. pp. 419–439. ISBN 978-3-96110-251-8.
- Wedekind, Klaus; Mohammed, Mahmud (2008). "A Beja saga in four dialects: Lexical and other differences". In Takács, Gábor (ed.). Semito-Hamitic Festschrift for A. B. Dogopolsky and H. Jungraithmayr. Berlin: Reimer. pp. 266–378.
- Wedekind, Klaus; Wedekind, Charlotte; Musa, Abuzeinab (2004–2005). Beja Pedagogical Grammar (PDF). Aswan and Asmara.
- Wedekind, Klaus; Wedekind, Charlotte; Musa, Abuzeinab (2007). A Learner's Grammar of Beja (East Sudan). Cologne: Rüdiger Köppe Verlag.
- Wedekind, Klaus (2006). "Beja Narratives: Pursuit of Participants and Analysis of Aspects". Ethnorema. 2: 101–128. ISSN 1826-8803.
- Wedekind, Klaus (2010). "More on the Ostracon of Browne's Textus Blemmyicus". Annali, Sezione Orientale. 70: 73–81. ISSN 0393-3180.
- Wedekind, Klaus; Musa, Musa; Mahamed, Feki; Talib, Mohamed (2017). "Forthcoming - Klaus Wedekind, with Abuzeinab Musa, Feki Mahamed, Mohamed Talib, et al., "Trilingual dictionary of Beja" [arranged by the provenience of entries: S. Egypt, E. Sudan, N. Eritrea]".
- Zaborski, Andrzej (1988). "Remarks on the Verb in Beja". In Arbeitman, Yoël (ed.). Fucus: A Semitic/Afrasian Gathering in Remembrance of Albert Ehrman. John Benjamins Publishing. pp. 491–498. ISBN 978-9027235527.
- Zaborski, Andrzej (1997). "Problems of the Beja Present Seven Years Ago". Lingua Posnaniensis. 39: 145–153.
