= Anna Siewierska =

British linguist (1955–2011)

- Born: 25 December 1955; Gdynia, Poland
- Died: 6 August 2011 (aged 55); Da Lat, Vietnam
- Education: Monash University
- Known for: Language typology
- Spouse: Dik Bakker
- Scientific career
- Fields: Language typology
- Workplaces: University of Gdańsk; University of Amsterdam; Lancaster University
- Doctoral advisor: Barry Blake
- Website: Siewierska on the website of Lancaster University

Anna Maria Siewierska (born Gdynia, Poland, 25 December 1955, died Da Lat, Vietnam, 6 August 2011) was a Polish-born linguist who worked in Australia, Poland, the Netherlands and the United Kingdom. She was professor of linguistics at Department of Linguistics and English Language Lancaster University and a leading specialist in language typology.

== Life ==
During her youth, Anna Siewierska spent several years in Australia, while her father worked for a Polish trade company in Melbourne. She studied linguistics at Monash University under Barry Blake, writing an M.A. thesis on passive constructions that was later published as a book (Note: Siewierska (1984)) and was widely cited.

From 1980, she worked at the University of Gdańsk and took active part in the historic events surrounding the rise of Solidarność, working as a link between the trade union's leadership and English-speaking journalists. She received her PhD degree from Monash University in 1985, with a dissertation on word order. (Note: Siewierska (1988))

Between 1990 and 1994 she was associated with the University of Amsterdam, working in Simon Dik's Functional Grammar group, before moving to Lancaster University. She was president of the Societas Linguistica Europaea in 2001–2002, and president of the Association for Linguistic Typology between 2007 and 2011.

She was married to the Dutch linguist Dik Bakker. She died in a car accident while on holiday in Vietnam following a conference on linguistic typology in Hong Kong.

== Contributions ==
Siewierska was best known for her work on world-wide comparative grammar (language typology), where she worked on a wide range of phenomena, often comparing hundreds of languages from around the world. She always had an interest in voice phenomena such as passive constructions (Note: Siewierska (1984)) and impersonal constructions, (Note: Malchukov & Siewierska (2011)) as well as the grammar of objects. (Note: Siewierska (1998), (2003)) She did extensive work on word order phenomena in the world's languages. (Note: Siewierska (1988), (ed. 1998)) From the mid-1990s onward, much of her typological work focused on person markers such as personal pronouns and agreement markers. (Note: Siewierska (1998a), (1999a), (1999b), (2003), (2004), (2005a), Siewierska & Bakker (2005))

Siewierska contributed significantly to building bridges in linguistics between different schools. She had an early association with Functional Grammar and other functionalist approaches to the study of language structure, but she also tried to incorporate insights from generative frameworks such as Lexical Functional Grammar, (Note: Siewierska (1999a), (1999b), (1999b), (2006)) from corpus linguistics, (Note: Siewierska (1993), Siewierska et al. (2010)) and from cognitive linguistics and construction grammar. (Note: Hollmann & Siewierska (2007), (2011))

== Selected works ==
A complete bibliography appears in Languages Across Boundaries: Studies in Memory of Anna Siewierska, edited by Dik Bakker and Martin Haspelmath.

- Hengeveld, Kees, Jan Rijkhoff & Anna Siewierska. 2004. Parts of speech systems as a basic typological parameter. Journal of Linguistics 40.2: 527–570.
- Hollmann, Willem B. & Anna Siewierska. 2007. A construction grammar account of possessive constructions in Lancashire dialect: Some advantages and challenges. English Language and Linguistics 11: 407–424.
- Hollmann, Willem B. & Anna Siewierska. 2011. The status of frequency, schemas, and identity in cognitive sociolinguistics: A case study on definite article reduction. Cognitive Linguistics 22.1: 25–54.
- Malchukov, Andrej, & Anna Siewierska (eds.). 2011. Impersonal constructions: A cross-linguistic perspective. Amsterdam: Benjamins.
- Siewierska, Anna. 1984. The passive: A comparative linguistic analysis. London: Routledge.
- Siewierska, Anna. 1988. Word order rules. Kent: Croom Helm.
- Siewierska, Anna. 1991. Functional grammar. London: Routledge.
- Siewierska, Anna. 1993. Subject and object order in written Polish: Some statistical data. Folia Linguistica 27. 1/2, 147–169.
- Siewierska, Anna. 1998a. Nominal and verbal person marking. Linguistic Typology 2, 1–53.
- Siewierska, Anna. 1998b. Languages with and without objects. Languages in Contrast 1.2: 173–190.
- Siewierska, Anna (ed.) 1998. Constituent order in the languages of Europe. Berlin: Mouton de Gruyter.
- Siewierska, Anna. 1999a. Reduced pronominals and argument prominence. In Miriam Butt and Tracy Holloway King (eds.), Proceedings of the LFG 99 Conference. Stanford: CSIL Publications.
- Siewierska, Anna. 1999b. From anaphoric pronoun to grammatical agreement marker: Why objects don't make it. Folia Linguistica 33/2: 225–251.
- Siewierska, Anna. 2003. Person agreement and the determination of alignment. Transactions of the Philological Society 101.2, 339–370.
- Siewierska, Anna. 2004. Person. Cambridge: Cambridge University Press.
- Siewierska, Anna. 2005a. Verbal person marking. In Martin Haspelmath, Matthew S. Dryer, David Gil, & Bernard Comrie (eds.), The world atlas of language structures, 414–417. Oxford: Oxford University Press. (Available online here.)
- Siewierska, Anna. 2005b. Passive constructions. In Martin Haspelmath, Matthew S. Dryer, David Gil, & Bernard Comrie (eds.), The world atlas of language structures. Oxford: Oxford University Press. (Available online here.)
- Siewierska, Anna. 2006. Linguistic typology: Where functionalism and formalism almost meet. In A. Duszak & U. Okulska (eds.), Bridges and walls in metalinguistic discourse. Berlin: Peter Lang, 57–76.
- Siewierska, Anna & Dik Bakker. 2005. The agreement cross-reference continuum: Person marking in Functional Grammar. In: Kees Hengeveld & Casper de Groot (eds.), Morphosyntactic expression in Functional Grammar. Berlin: Mouton de Gruyter, 203–248.
- Siewierska, Anna & Jae Jung Song (eds.) 1998. Case, typology and grammar (festschrift for Barry Blake). Amsterdam: Benjamins.
- Siewierska, Anna, Jiajin Xu & Richard Xiao. 2010. Bang-le yi ge da mang (offered a big helping hand): A corpus study of the splittable compounds in spoken and written Chinese. Language Sciences 32: 464–487.
