= Ante Aikio =

Finnish linguist (born 1977)

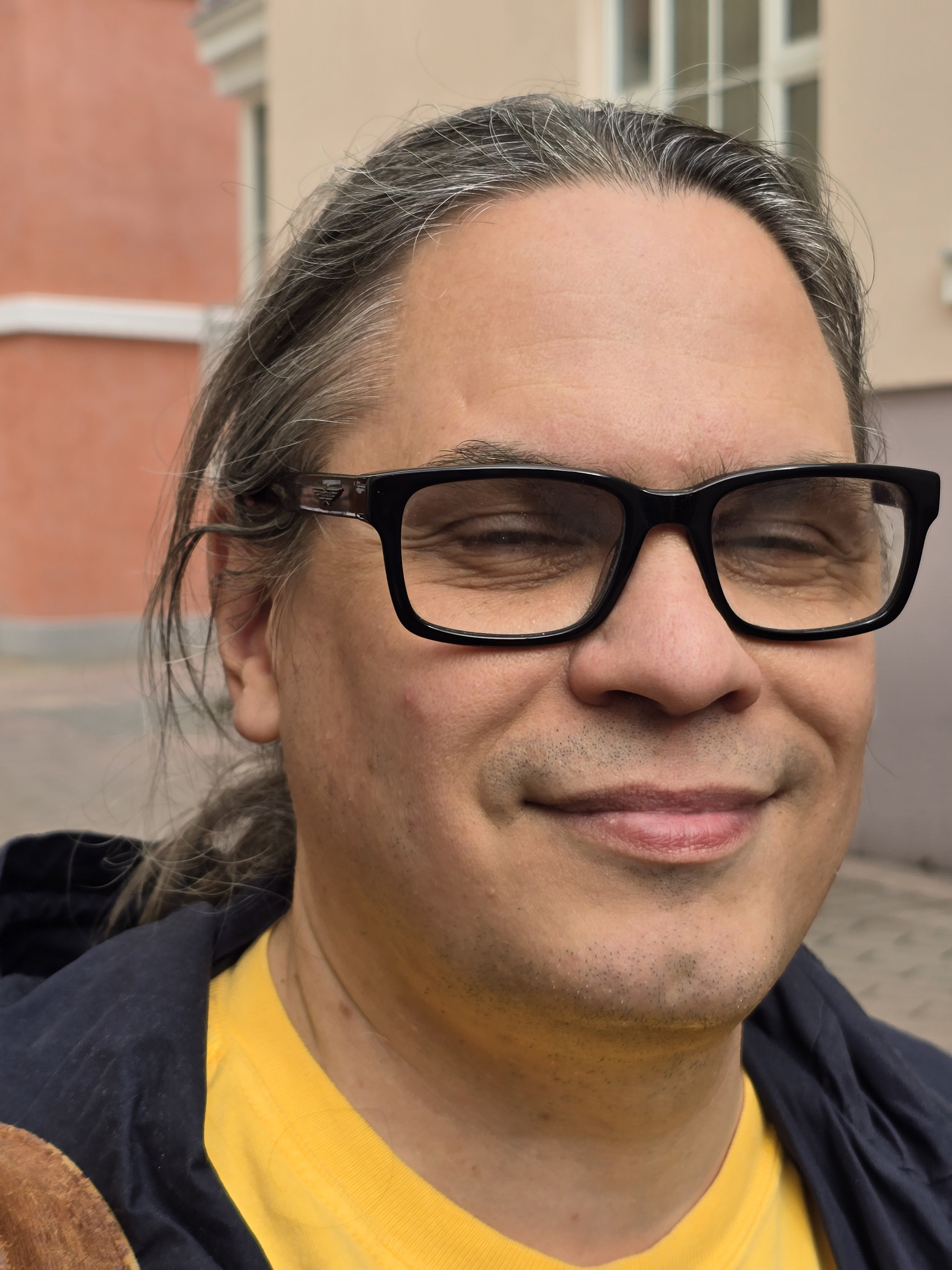
Ante Aikio in 2025

Ante Aikio (Northern Sami: Luobbal Sámmol Sámmol Ánte; born 1977) is a Finnish linguist of Sámi origin who has been a professor of Sámi languages at the Sámi University of Applied Sciences in Kautokeino, Norway since 2015. Prior to this he served as a professor of Sámi language at the Giellagas Institute at the University of Oulu in Finland.

In 2009, Aikio published his dissertation on Sámi loanwords in Finnish. In addition, Aikio has widely studied the history and etymology of the Uralic languages and the Sámi ethnolinguistic past.

== Important publications ==
- Ante Aikio. An essay on substrate studies and the origin of Saami, in Etymologie, Entlehnungen und Entwicklungen: Festschrift für Jorma Koivulehto zum 70. Geburtstag, Société Néophilologique de Helsinki, Helsinki, 2004.
- Jussi Ylikoski & Ante Aikio (ed.) Sámit, sánit, sátnehámit – riepmoc̆ála Pekka Sammallahtii miessemánu 21. beaivve 2007, Suomalais-Ugrilainen Seura, Helsinki, 2007.
- Ante Aikio. The Saami loanwords in Finnish and Karelian, Oulun yliopisto, Oulu, 2009. Academia.edu
- Ante Aikio. "An essay on Saami ethnolinguistic prehistory", A Linguistic Map of Prehistoric Northern Europe, in Mémoires de la Société Finno-Ougrienne Vol. 266, pp. 63–117, 2012. PDF
- Ante Aikio. "Proto-Uralic", in Bakró-Nagy, Marianne; Laakso, Johanna; Skribnik, Elena (eds.). Oxford Guide to the Uralic Languages. Oxford, UK: Oxford University Press. pp. 46, 50–52, 2019. Academia.edu
