= North Cushitic languages =

Branch of Cushitic languages spoken in Northeast Africa

North Cushitic
- Geographic distribution: Sudan, Eritrea, Egypt
- Ethnicity: Medjay, Blemmyes, Beja
- Linguistic classification: Afro-Asiatic: Cushitic; North Cushitic
- Subdivisions: Medjay • Beja • Blemmyan†

Language codes
- Glottolog: beja1238

The North Cushitic languages comprise a branch of the Cushitic family within the Afro-Asiatic language phylum. It includes the modern day Beja language, spoken primarily in Sudan, Eritrea, and parts of Egypt, with several extinct languages such as Medjay and Blemmyan. It is distinguished by unique phonological and lexical features that set it apart from other spoken Cushitic languages.

== Overview ==
The North Cushitic branch is also sometimes called Beja or Bedawi, is a subgroup of the Cushitic family of languages. This representation under the Afro-Asiatic language family was repeatedly observed and discussed by linguists. Beja is the only living representative of this branch, spoken primarily in Sudan, Eritrea, and parts of Egypt. Traditionally, extinct languages like Medjay and Blemmyan have been considered to be part of the North Cushitic branch. Ancient Egyptian records make mention of the Medjay and Blemmyes tribes as inhabiting this land.

== Identification and classification ==
More specifically, North Cushitic was recognized for the first time by linguists like Moreno and others as a branch in its own right. Only later did Moreno and others recognize it as a separate branch, pointing out its structural differences with other Cushitic subgroups. Although the view that Beja is a sole surviving representative has been widely accepted, other extinct languages spoken in the area, such as Blemmyan and Medjay, are normally connected with this branch. They established structural, phonological, and lexical features distinguishing it from other Cushitic branches: East, Central, and South Cushitic. This view has been corroborated by the comparison of Beja with cognate Cushitic languages. Studies have also shown that the Beja language only shares 20% of its vocabulary with its closest geographically neighbour Cushitic languages of Saho and Afar spoken in Eritrea and Ethiopia and whose classification is classified as East Cushitic and with the Agaw languages of Ethiopia classified as Central Cushitic.

=== Historical languages linked to North Cushitic ===
Beja, Medjay, and Blemmyan are affiliated primarily through historical and linguistic records with North Cushitic. Medjay is named from ancient Egyptian records and represents a pastoralist people in the Eastern Desert. The Blemmyes are recorded throughout the Roman and Byzantine periods and are believed to have spoken a language closely related to Beja.
