= Linguistic Typology =

Academic journal

- Discipline: Linguistic typology
- Language: English
- Edited by: Maria Koptjevskaja-Tamm

Publication details
- History: 1997-present
- Publisher: Mouton de Gruyter on behalf of the Association for Linguistic Typology
- Frequency: Triannually
- Impact factor: 0.455 (2015)

Standard abbreviations
- ISO 4: Linguist. Typology

Indexing
- ISSN: 1430-0532 (print); 1613-415X (web)
- LCCN: 2015207515
- OCLC no.: 48273941

Links
- Journal homepage; Journal page at association's website

Linguistic Typology is a triannual peer-reviewed academic journal in the field of linguistic typology. It was established in 1997, and is published by Mouton de Gruyter on behalf of the Association for Linguistic Typology. The editor-in-chief was Frans Plank until 2018, and is now Maria Koptjevskaja-Tamm (Stockholm University).

== Abstracting and indexing ==
- Arts & Humanities Citation Index
- Current Contents/Arts & Humanities
- Current Contents/Social and Behavioral Sciences
- EBSCO databases
- International Bibliography of Periodical Literature in the Humanities and Social Sciences
- Linguistic Bibliography
- MLA International Bibliography
- ProQuest databases
- Scopus
- Social Sciences Citation Index

According to the Journal Citation Reports, the journal has a 2015 impact factor of 0.455.
