= Arabian-Nubian Shield =

Exposure of Precambrian crystalline rocks on the flanks of the Red Sea

Extent of the Arabian-Nubian Shield. To the west it borders the Saharan Metacraton. Colors indicate the age of the rocks (Archean, Pre-Neoproterozoic, Mesoproterozoic, Neoproterozoic).

The Arabian-Nubian Shield in the supercontinent Pannotia c. 570 million years ago, before the opening of the Red Sea.

The Arabian-Nubian Shield (ANS) is an exposure of Precambrian crystalline rocks on the flanks of the Red Sea. The crystalline rocks are mostly Neoproterozoic in age. Geographically – and from north to south – the ANS includes parts of Israel, Jordan, Egypt, Saudi Arabia, Sudan, Eritrea, Ethiopia, Yemen, and Somalia. The ANS in the north is exposed as part of the Sahara Desert and Arabian Desert, and in the south in the Ethiopian Highlands, Asir province of Arabia and Yemen Highlands.

The ANS was the site of some of man's earliest geologic efforts, principally by the ancient Egyptians to extract gold from the rocks of Egypt and NE Sudan. This was the most easily worked of all metals and does not tarnish. All of the gold deposits in Egypt and northern Sudan were found and exploited by Egyptians. The earliest preserved geological map was made in 1150 BCE to show the location of gold deposits in Eastern Egypt; it is known as the Turin papyrus. New gold discoveries have been found in Sudan, Eritrea, and Saudi Arabia.

Pharonic Egyptians also quarried granite near Aswan and floated this down the Nile to be used as facing for the pyramids. The Greek name for Aswan, Syene; is the type locality for the igneous rock syenite. The Romans followed this tradition and had many quarries especially in the northern part of the Eastern Desert of Egypt where porphyry and granite were mined and shaped for shipment.

Precious and industrial metals, including gold, silver, copper, zinc, tin, and lead, have been mined in Saudi Arabia for at least 5,000 years. The most productive mine in Saudi Arabia, Mahd adh Dhahab ("Cradle of Gold"), has been periodically exploited for its mineral wealth for hundreds or even thousands of years and is reputed to be the original source of King Solomon's legendary gold. Today, mining at Mahd adh Dhahab is conducted by the Saudi Arabian Mining Company, Ma'aden. Deposits of iron, tungsten, mineral sands, copper and phosphates have been found in many locations. Mining in the Eastern Desert of Egypt and Sudan is limited due to a shortage of water and infrastructure.

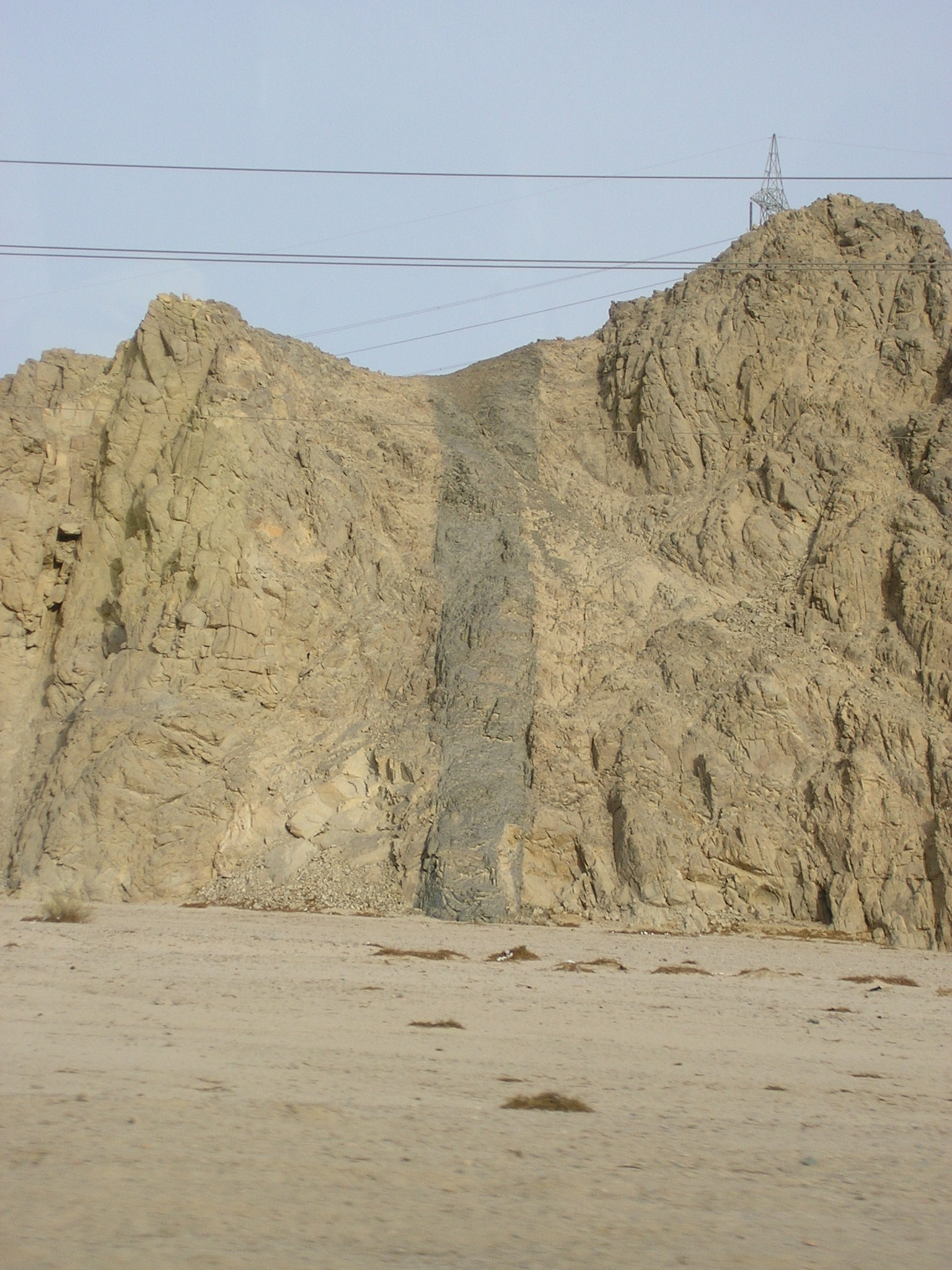
Mafic dyke cutting through granite, Arabian-Nubian Shield

== Development of the Arabian-Nubian Shield ==
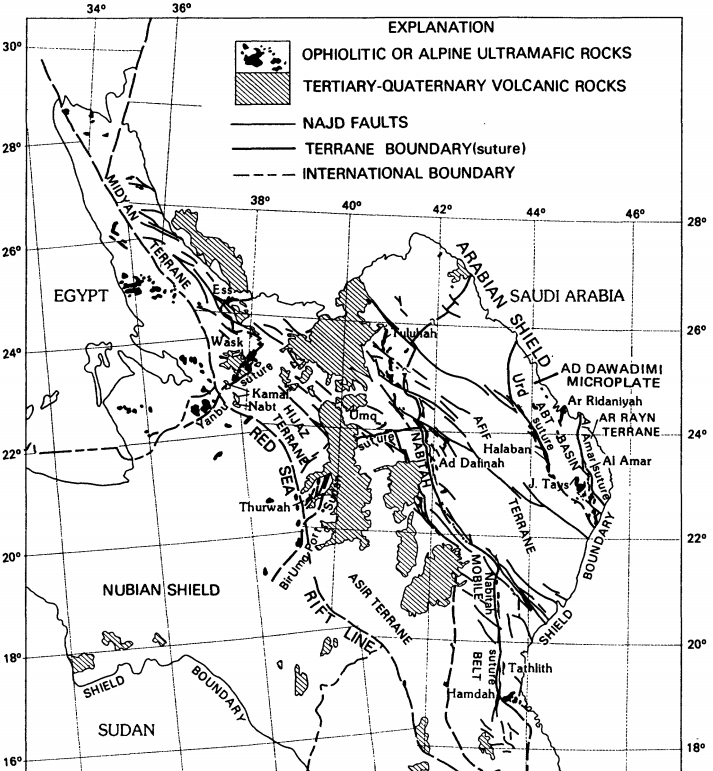
Arabian-Nubian Shield prior to the Red Sea Rift, with Arabian Shield terranes labelled

The Arabian-Nubian Shield (ANS) is the northern half of a great collision zone called the East African Orogeny. This collision zone formed near the end of Neoproterozoic time when East and West Gondwana collided to form the supercontinent Gondwana. The East African orogeny extends southward to the Mozambique Belt, and is a subset of the overall Pan-African orogeny. The assembly of Gondwana coincided with the breakup of Rodinia, closure of the Mozambique Ocean, and growth of the shield at 870 million years ago (Ma). This shield growth extended for the next 300 million years, and included island arc convergence and terrane suturing at 780 Ma, with final assembly by 550 Ma. At this time, the East African Orogen became a passive margin and the southern shore of the Paleo-Tethys Ocean.

The shield is divided into crustal blocks or tectonostratigraphic terranes delineated by ophiolite shear zones or sutures. These terranes are paired across the Red Sea, starting from the south, these include Nakfa (870–840 Ma) with Asir (785–720 Ma, 850–790 Ma), Haya (870–790 Ma) with Jiddah (870–760 Ma), Gabgaba (735–700 Ma) and Gebeit (832–810 Ma) with Hijaz (870–807 Ma), and Eastern Desert (810–720 Ma) with Midyan (780–710 Ma). In addition the Halfa (2600–1200 Ma, 750–718 Ma) and Bayuda (806 Ma) terranes are in the western portion of the shield, and the Hulayfah (720 Ma), Ha'il (740 Ma), Afif (750–695 Ma, 840–820 Ma, 1860–1660 Ma), Ad-Dawadimi (695–680 Ma), and Ar-Rayn (667 Ma) terranes in the eastern portion.

Key amalgamation events, starting 780–760 Ma, with the formation of the Tabalah–Tarj Shear Zone, the gneiss Afaf Belt, and the 600 km (370 mi) long and 565 km (351 mi) wide Bi'r Umq and Nakasib Suture (780–760 Ma), an ophiolite-decorated fold-shear zone, between the Jiddah–Haya and Hijaz–Gebeit Terranes. Then between 750 and 660 Ma, the Atmur–Delgo Suture formed as Halfa Terrane ophiolite nappes were thrust onto the Bayuda Terrane. Simultaneously, the Allaqi–Heiani–Sol and Hamed–Onib–Yanbu Suture formed, consisting of nappes and portions of ophiolite along an east-trending shear zone between the Gebeit–Hijaz and Eastern Desert Terrane and Midyan Terranes. Between 680 and 640 Ma, the 600 km (370 mi) long and 5–30 km (3–19 mi) wide Hulayfah–Ad-Dafinah–Ruwah Suture formed between the Afif Terrance and terranes to the southwest. Simultaneously, the Halaban Suture formed between the Afif and Ad-Dawadimi Terranes as a nappe of Halaban ophiolite thrust westward. In addition, the Al-Amar Suture, consisting of the Al-Amar Fault zone with ophiolite lenses, between the Ad-Dawadimi and Ar-Rayan Terranes, while the Nabitah Fault Zone formed in Asir Terrane. The final amalgamation event occurred 650–600 Ma, when the Keraf Suture, consisting of ophiolite folded and sheared rocks, formed between the Bayuda–Halfa and GebeitGabgaba Terranes.

Post-amalgamation events include the formation of the Huqf Supergroup (732–540 Ma) in Oman and western Saudi Arabia, which accumulated in basement basins, the first 1,100 m (3,600 ft) of which include glaciomarine deposits with diamictites and dropstones from the Sturtian and Marinoan glaciations. Gneiss belts and domes forming in the Late Neoproterozoic include the Kirsh gneiss in the Arabian shield and the Meatiq gneiss dome in the Eastern Desert. Late Neoproterozoic shear zones include the Hamisana Shear Zone (665–610 Ma), the Ar-Rika–Qazaz Shear Zone (640–610 Ma) within the Najd Fault System, and the Oko Shear Zone (700–560 Ma).

A number of features have been ascribed to late stage extensional tectonics including a widespread northeast trending dyke swarm, northeast–southwest trending normal faults and northwest–southeast trending sedimentary basins filled with post-orogenic molasse deposits

Crustal weaknesses before 500 Ma influenced continental rifting, as the Arabian peninsula moved away from Africa, and the formation of the Red Sea Basin at the start of the Oligocene. By then, some of the Paleozoic and Mesozoic rocks had been eroded, if ever deposited. In fact, the 1,200 km (750 mi) wide ANS orogenic belt, has a present-day layered crustal structure, with a uniform Moho depth of 35–45 km (22–28 mi). Post-rift deposition of evaporites occurred until the Pliocene, when a marine environment took over.

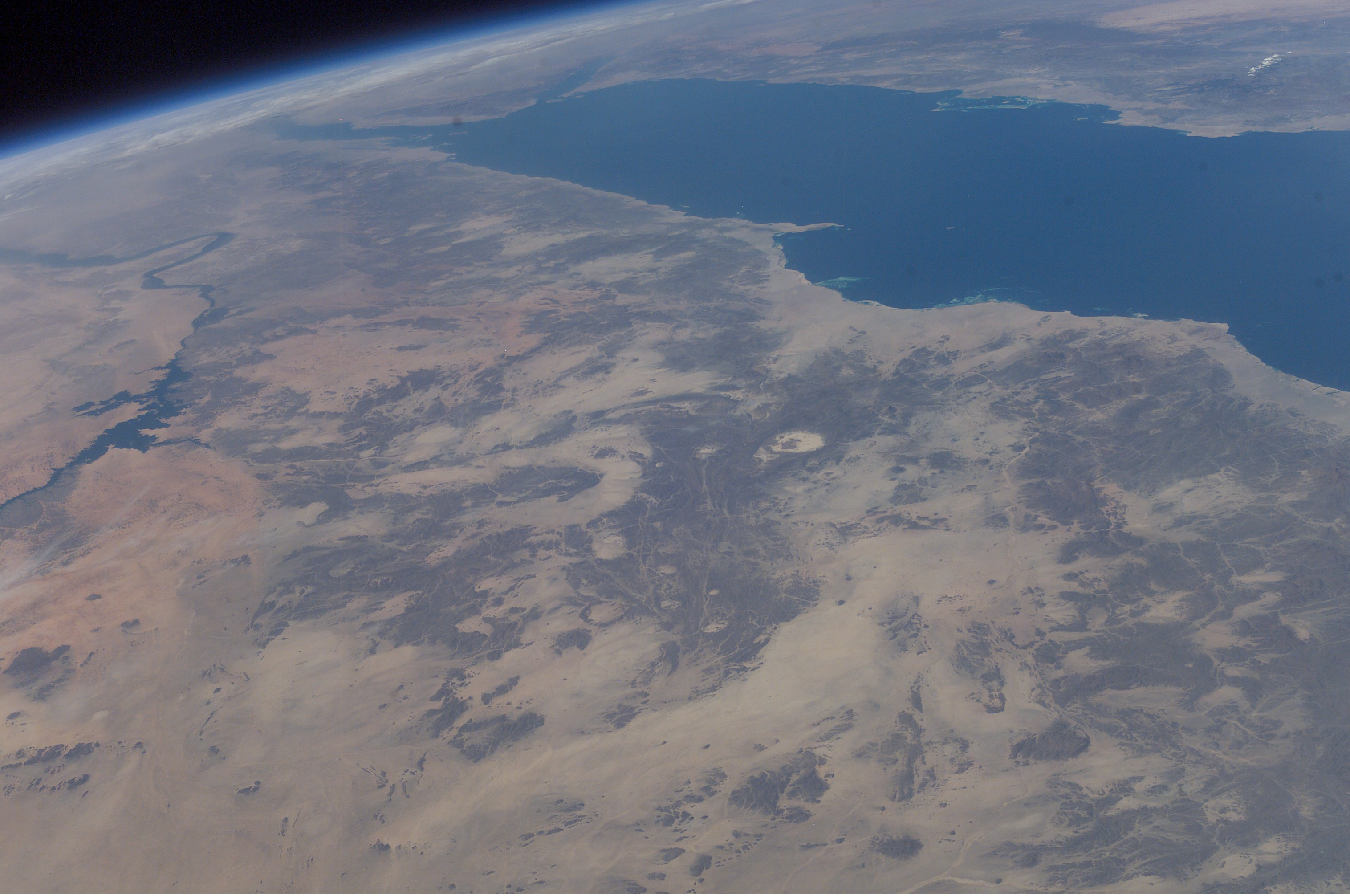
Astronaut photograph (ISS006-E-43186) of the Arabian-Nubian Shield in eastern Sudan, looking northeast, with the Red Sea in the background. The north–south structure in the center of the image is the Hamisana Shear Zone. The ANS exposures in eastern Egypt to the north can also be seen, as well as part of the Nile (left) and Arabia (right).

== Gold deposits in Egypt and Nubian Sudan ==
As Rosemarie and Dietrich Klemm point out, "...gold deposits exploited in antiquity occur almost exclusively in the Neoproterozoic sequences of the ANS in the Eastern Desert in Egypt and Northern Sudan." The shield in this part of Africa consists of a cratonic African basement or "infrastructure", overlain by a pan-African overthrust "superstructure". The infrastructure consists of migmatite gneiss and gneiss domes such as Gebel Hafafit and Gebel Meatiq. The metamorphism is associated with overthrust tectonics, but bear no relationship to the ancient gold mines. The superstructure consists of an ophiolite-like sequences with island arc volcanics, Hammamat sediments, and post orogenic granites. The ophiolite sequences range in age from 746 to 832 million years (Ma) and are mainly serpentite with elevated gold values of 25 parts per billion. The Hammamat sediments, common in Wadi Hammamat and referred to as "bekhen" stone, consist of greywackes and siltstones, which are slightly enriched in gold. The Hammamat sediments include dike intrusions and the dacite to rhyolite Dokhan volcanics, which formed in the early stages of orogeny at 625–600 Ma. These volcanics include the Roman imperial porphyry quarries. The granite intrusions include two sequences, an older one 709–614 Ma, and a younger sequence at 596–544 Ma, which includes the Aswan granite at 565 Ma. The margin of the includes granodiorite and diorite, and most importantly, auriferous quartz veins. These veins mineralized from hydrothermal flow inside tectonic extensional gaps, or within cavities from shearing. These characteristics were exploited by New Kingdom of Egypt prospectors. This is especially true for ancient gold exploitations oriented in north-northwest–south-southeast shear zones, such as the sites at Hammama, Abu Had North, Wad Atalla el-Mur, Atalla, Umm el Esh Sarga, Fawakhir, El-Sid, Umm Soleimat and Hamuda.

Wadi el-Sid was the chief mining area for the New Kingdom of Egypt, with high gold grades of 30 grams per tonne in the mineralized quartz veins within sheared ophiolite sequences of serpentinite and metabasalt, imbricated with Hammamat sediments, in direct contact with the tonalite margins of the Fawakhir granite pluton. The ophiolite nappe dates from 850 to 770 Ma, while the Fawakhir pluton dates from 574 Ma. These gold-rich veins are oriented according to post-tectonic extension, something the Egyptian prospectors understood.

The well of Umm el-Fawakhir area includes a Large Ptolemaic settlement and round stone mills dating from the Roman or Early Arab Period to the oval stone mills of the New Kingdom. Even fist hammers from the Old/Middle Kingdom are present. Tailings were reworked by the Louison Company from the 1930s until 1956.

== Volcanogenic massive sulfide ore deposit external links ==
- Hamama VMS deposit in Egypt
- Bisha VMS deposit in Eritrea
- Hassai VMS deposit in Northern Sudan
- Jabal Sayid VMS deposit in Saudi Arabia

== See also ==
- Mons Claudianus
- Barramiya
- Wadi el-Hudi
- Jubayt, Sudan
- Ariab
- Wadi Allaqi
