= Johanna Laakso =

Linguist

Johanna Marja Leena Laakso (born 1962 in Helsinki) is a Finnish linguist and Finno-Ugrist based at the University of Vienna.

== Biography ==
Laakso studied Finno-Ugric languages, Finnic languages and general linguistics at the University of Helsinki from 1979 to 1990, graduating with a Cand.phil. in 1985, a licentiate in 1988, and a PhD in 1990. Her doctoral thesis was on verbal derivational morphology in the Finnic languages.

From 1987 onwards she worked as an assistant at the University of Helsinki, with stints as acting professor of Finnic languages in 1989–90 and acting professor of Finno-Ugric languages in 1991. In 2000 she moved to the University of Vienna to take up her current position as professor of Finno-Ugric studies.

Laakso has been a member of the Finnish Academy of Science and Letters since 2006, a corresponding member of the Austrian Academy of Sciences since 2008, and an elected member of the Academia Europaea since 2015.

== Research ==
Laakso is a specialist in Finno-Ugric languages, with interests in historical linguistics, morphology and word formation, language and gender, language contact, and minority languages.

In a 2016 volume, Laakso and co-authors make the case that the European Union, European countries in general, and the Nordic countries in particular are failing to provide sufficient support for minority languages and their speakers, citing the cases of Meänkieli, Kven, Karelian and Estonian.

== Selected publications ==
- Laakso, Johanna. 1990. Translatiivinen verbinjohdin NE itämerensuomalaisissa kielissä (The translative verbal derivation suffix NE in the Finnic languages). PhD thesis, University of Helsinki. Mémoires de la Société Finno-Ougrienne.
- Laakso, Johanna. 2001. The Finnic languages. In Östen Dahl & Maria Koptjevskaja-Tamm (eds.), Circum-Baltic Languages, Volume 1: Past and Present, 179–212. Amsterdam: John Benjamins.
- Laakso, Johanna. 2005. Our Otherness: Finno-Ugrian Approaches to Women's Studies, Or Vice Versa. Vienna: Lit Verlag. ISBN 9783825886264
- Laakso, Johanna. 2011. The Uralic languages. In Bernd Kortmann & Johan van der Auwera (eds.), The languages and linguistics of Europe: a comprehensive guide, 179–198. Berlin: De Gruyter. ISBN 9783110220261
- Laakso, Johanna, Anneli Sarhimaa, Sia Spiliopoulou Åkermark, and Reetta Toivanen. 2016. Towards openly multilingual policies and practices: Assessing minority language maintenance across Europe. Bristol: Multilingual Matters. ISBN 9781783094950
- Bakró-Nagy, Marianne, Johanna Laakso, and Elena Skribnik (eds.). 2022. The Oxford Guide to the Finno-Ugric Languages. Oxford: Oxford University Press. ISBN 9780198767664
