= Amarar tribe =

Nomadic tribe in Eritrea and Sudan

Amarar
Regions with significant populations
- Sudan and Eritrea

Languages
- Beja (Bidhaawyeet)

Religion
- Sunni Islam

Related ethnic groups
- Other Beja

Amarar (Also known as Wagada' Amaraar) is a nomadic tribe of the Beja people inhabiting the mountainous country to the west of the Red Sea, Suakin northwards, and Eritrea towards Sudan. Between them and the Nile are the Ababda and Bisharin Beja tribes and to their south dwell the Hadendoa (another Beja subgroup).

The country of the Amarar is called the Atbai. Their main location is in the Ariab region. The tribe is divided into four great families: (1) Weled Gwilei, (2) Weled Aliab, (3) Weled Kurbab Wagadab, and (4) the Amarar proper of the Ariab district. The Wagardha' settle in Sudan, Eritrea and Somalia . They are said to be of Quraysh blood through Ammar Aqiili and to be the descendants of an invading Arab army. The Amarar speak a form of the Beja language that uses fewer loanwords than other groups that speak Beja.
