= Barramiya =

- Location within Egypt

Location
- Location: Al-Bahr Al-Ahmar, Egypt; 25.07648°N 33.7785°E

Barramiya is a mining area in Egypt, in the Red Sea governorate, in the southeastern part of the country, about 600 km south of the capital Cairo. Barramiya is located 468 meters above sea level.

The territory around Barramiya is mostly flat, but the north is hilly. The highest point nearby is 545 meters above sea level, and is located 1.4 km northeast of Barramiya. The neighborhood around is almost uninhabited, with less than two people per square kilometer; it is also sterile, with little or no vegetation.

== Climate ==
The area has a warm desert climate. The average annual temperature in the district is 31 °C. The hottest month is June, with an average temperature of 38 °C, and the coldest is January, with 20 °C. The average annual rainfall is 23 mm. The wettest month is March, with an average of 7 mm of rain, and the driest is February, with 1 mm of rain.

== Gold mining ==
A stele by Seti I found at the Kanais temple, mentions a well in Wadi Myah for the gold miners. Mill artifacts from the Ptolemaic Kingdom and New Kingdom of Egypt are present, including ore washing facilities, besides the remains of a New Kingdom settlement. Quartz veins were mined for gold, probably dating back to the Old Kingdom Period. Enough gold remained for profitable exploitation between 1907 and 1919.

== See also ==
- Arabian Nubian Shield
