= Marianne Bakró-Nagy =

Linguist

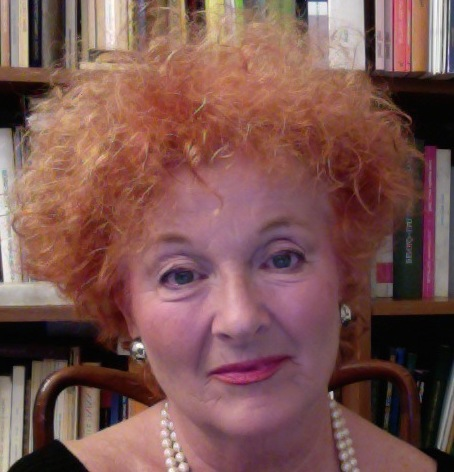
- Portrait of Marianne Bakró-Nagy

Marianne Bakró-Nagy (born 2 November 1946 in Budapest) is a linguist and Finno-Ugrist who is emeritus professor at the University of Szeged and the Hungarian Research Centre for Linguistics.

== Education, career and honours ==
Bakró-Nagy studied English, Hungarian and Finno-Ugric linguistics to MA level at Eötvös Loránd University between 1970 and 1976. She received her candidate (doctoral) degree from the Hungarian Academy of Sciences in 1990, and her Doctor of Sciences degree (higher doctorate) from the same institution in 2002.

Bakró-Nagy was affiliated with the Hungarian Research Centre for Linguistics consistently from 1971 until her retirement in 2016, initially as a research fellow, then as deputy director (1982–1995), head of the department of Finno-Ugric and historical linguistics (1993–2016), and research professor (2011–2016). In parallel to this, she was assistant professor at Eötvös Loránd University from 1993 to 2001 as well as lecturer at the University of Jyväskylä in Finland (1993–1995) and head of the Finno-Ugric department of the Janus Pannonius University in Pécs (1996–1997). In 2001 she took up a position as full professor at the University of Szeged, which she again held until her retirement in 2016.

Bakró-Nagy has received numerous honours and awards for her work, including an honorary doctorate from the University of Helsinki (2007), the First Class Medal of the Order of the White Rose of Finland (2011), and the Officer's Cross of the Hungarian Order of Merit (2016). In 2021 she was elected ordinary member of the Academia Europaea.

== Research ==
Within the empirical domain of the Finno-Ugric languages, Bakró-Nagy's research has ranged broadly over topics including historical linguistics and language change, anthropological linguistics, taboo and secret languages, and cultural remembrance in Mansi folklore texts. The Ob-Ugric languages have been a particular focus of her research. Along with Johanna Laakso and Elena Skribnik she is editor of the Oxford Guide to the Uralic Languages (2022).

Bakró-Nagy has been co-investigator on several international grant-funded projects, including Ob-Ugric languages: conceptual structures, lexicon, constructions, categories - "An innovative approach to creating descriptive resources for Khanty and Mansi" (2009–2015), Innovative Networking in Infrastructure for Endangered Languages (2011–2014), and Changes in the Eurasian steppes and their peripheries (2015–2018).

== Selected publications ==
- Bakró-Nagy, Marianne. 1979. Die Sprache des Bärenkultes im obugrischen (The language of the Ob-Ugric bear cult). Akadémiai Kiadó. ISBN 9789630518444
- Bakró-Nagy, Marianne. 1992. Proto-phonotactics: phonotactic investigation of the PU and PFU consonant system on the basis of the Uralisches etymologisches Wörterbuch (Uralic etymological dictionary). Berlin: Harrassowitz. ISBN 9783447033220
- Bakró-Nagy, Marianne. 2012. The Uralic languages. Revue belge de Philologie et d'Histoire (Belgian review of philology and history) 90 (3), 1001–1027. doi:10.3406/rbph.2012.8272
- Bakró-Nagy, Marianne. 2018. Mansi loanword phonology: a historical approach to the typology of repair strategies of Russian loanwords in Mansi. In Huba Bartos, Marcel den Dikken, Zoltán Bánréti & Tamás Váradi (eds.), Boundaries Crossed, at the Interfaces of Morphosyntax, Phonology, Pragmatics and Semantics, 51–66. Berlin: Springer.
- Bakró-Nagy, Marianne, Johanna Laakso & Elena Skribnik (eds.). 2022. The Oxford guide to the Uralic languages. Oxford: Oxford University Press. ISBN 9780198767664
