= Ariab =

Ariab (Arabic: أرياب) is a region of Sudan, located in the Nubian Desert. It is inhabited by the Beja people, and is home to the country's only commercial gold mine, run by French giant Areva. Gold mining has historically been crucially important for the desert region since Pharonic times.

The Canadian company LaMancha Resources (TSX:LMA) operates the Hassai open pit mine, and from May, 2011, plans to expand operations, once additional electrical and water resources are in place.

Wadi Ariab is oriented E-W. Gold mineralization is associated with a zone of massive sulphide mineralization in a marine rhyolite environment. According to Klemm and Klemm, the gold would have been "undetectable to ancient prospectors" due to its "extremely fine grain" nature. Furthermore, "no traces from ancient mining are known", and the 7 current opencast mines were discovered with modern geophysical prospecting methods.

== See also ==
- Arabian-Nubian Shield
- Mining industry of Sudan
