= Cognitive sociolinguistics =

Branch of linguistics

Cognitive sociolinguistics is an emerging field of linguistics that aims to account for linguistic variation in social settings with a cognitive explanatory framework. The goal of cognitive sociolinguists is to build a mental model of society, individuals, institutions and their relations to one another. Cognitive sociolinguists also strive to combine theories and methods used in cognitive linguistics and sociolinguistics to provide a more productive framework for future research on language variation. This burgeoning field concerning social implications on cognitive linguistics has yet received universal recognition.

== Development ==
Cognitive sociolinguistics understands how social meaning is transmitted and changed, all with a mental model framework. This notion was first formally introduced as an independent field of research by Gitte Kristiansen and Rene Dirven. Later, Dirk Geeraerts, an advocate of cognitive sociolinguistics, identified the field of investigation in three areas: behavior, attitudes, and evolution. Behavior seeks to understand socially structured variation in actual language use, while attitude attempts to understand how variation is perceived by speakers. In response to some criticism to this emerging field, he argues that the combination of cognition and sociolinguistics is relevant and important to our understanding of language because many aspects of language, such as allophones and phonemes, convey social meaning. Furthermore, meaning is also conveyed by the categorization of social groups and social stereotyping, all of which stem from a mental model.

== Relevant theories ==
=== Essentialism versus non-essentialism ===
The following theories are respectively tied to: 1. the concerns of cognitive linguistics, a semantic perspective and usage-based nature; 2. the tradition of sociolinguistics which describes the socially interactive nature of linguistic communication. The theories serve to lay bare the two distinct linguistic fields and introduce the need for a combination of the two—a cognitive sociolinguistic perspective.

- Essentialism is an Aristotelian concept that states that words have or should have a single definite or salient meaning that is unchangeable. This view states that for any specific kind of entity, there is a set of characteristics or properties all of which any entity of that kind must possess. This notion most often manifests itself in explicit what-is-questions, like "what is science?", or "what is ethical?". This view is challenged by certain cognitive sociolinguists who argue that this view only leads to further complications. For example, an individual may say "a hill is a small mountain", however, this may lead to a further discussion on what is 'small' and what is a 'mountain'.
- Non-essentialism argues that "there is no essence or set of common, predetermined qualities belonging to entities in the world." Karol Janicki asserts that concepts and most words are 'fuzzy' and will cause confusion, and that there is not a single definition of a word. Thus, meanings of words are context dependent. Janicki further asserts that definitions, when given, should not be read 'from the left to the right', but rather 'from the right to the left', as in 'a small mountain is called a hill,' which defines a mountain without trying to distinguish the 'essence of a hill'.

=== Usage-based variations ===
Different from the view of language being abstractly stored in human minds, usage-based variation is a result of phonological, morphosyntactic, semantic, and discourse-functional factors. The Processing Hypothesis of online speech states that when an individual is processing a statement in their minds, they will choose the participle placement that will require less processing effort. "For most variables, this means that the erg particle will precede the direct object when the direct object requires a lot of processing effort, whereas the verb particle will follow the direct object when the latter requires little processing effort." He thought up a new and complicated theory of syntactic change. In the case above, it is more natural to say the first sentence which results in the particle coming before the direct object because it is complex and requires more processing effort.

==== A case study: Dutch presentatives ====
In the Dutch language, adjunct-initial presentatives do not require the particle er in the post-verbal position. For example,

- Op de hoek van de straat is (er) een winkel
- On the corner of the street is (there) a shop
- "At the corner of the street, there is a shop"

Grondelaers interprets the function of er in adjunct-initial preventatives in the light of Langacker's reference point theory. His results from the data suggest the presence of er reflects how well the initial adjunct and the verb serve as a reference point to situate the subject referent. "With the insertion of er, the speaker signals that the hearer cannot situate the subject referent very well on the basis of the adjunct and the verb, thus preparing the hearer for a subject that will require a lot of processing."

== A case study in polysemy--adjective awesome ==
=== Introduction ===
A case study was conducted to show the benefits of cognitive sociolinguistic approach in investigating lexical polysemy (Robinson 2010). The advantage of such an approach was exemplified in people's different #usage-based variations in conceptualizations of the adjective awesome.

=== Experiment design ===
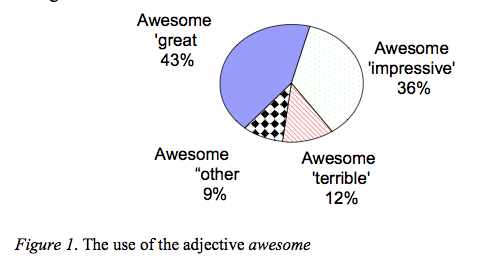
Use of adjective awesome

In the study, 72 English speakers were interviewed. They were locally born in South Yorkshire and ranged from age 11 to 92. To get the usage-based meanings of awesome, people were asked “who or what is awesome?” and after the volunteer's answer, a second question is posed, “why is ___ awesome?” Then, the response to that question shows the volunteer's usage-based conception of awesome.

The results analyzed in a cognitive semantics fashion confirms that awesome is a clustered with overlapping senses such as “great” “impressive” and “terrible”, as shown in the graph on the right. However, such analysis is sufficient only when the community is homogenous. Additionally, it is hard to observe patterns of language change and tendencies of usage. Sociolinguistic approach is, therefore, needed for a more thorough analysis of the data. Traditional sociolinguistic parameters—age, gender, socio-economic status—are taken into consideration. Figure 2 is a graph showing the usage of awesome in the context of age. It shows polysemous flexibility: not every meaning is equally representative within a polysemous category; not every meaning is equally salient for every speaker, even within the same speech community, which is important in the context of the value of socio-cognitive research. It extends the prototypical nature of meaning to (Rosch 1975, Geeraerts 1989) . It proposes methods towards usage-based concepts rather than abstract ones because each person's experiences in the worlds shape their understandings differently.

There is a clear pattern when we map the cognitive semantic analysis (as in Figure 1) onto the sociolinguistic analysis (as in Figure 2), that the use of the adjective is related to the speakers' age. Further, in the cognitive sociolinguistic fashioned analysis of external factors, there emerges a need of building a multifactorial statistical model. It measures the effect of multiple factors on the use of the senses of awesome at the same time. (In this case, the researchers employed logistic regression analysis, considering age group, gender, education, occupation and neighborhood environment.) This process of building a model to figure out what happens—how different factors contribute—to each individual (group) is an embodiment of the cognitive sociolinguistic approach of analysis.

=== Results from the statistical model ===
Logistic regression analysis evidences the use of awesome 'great' can be modeled from the age and gender of speakers, with age having a more significant overall effect than gender; awesome 'impressive' can be modeled from age, gender and potentially their living environment; no prediction can be made regarding the overall effect of external factors on the use of the meaning 'terrible'.

=== Analysis of the results ===
Age being significant in most variation, therefore, indicates the semantic change based on the apparent time construct. This is not novel to sociolinguistics, as Labov's (1963) Martha's Vineyard study was the pioneer work in this area. In the awesome study, as well, real-time evidence (from the Oxford English Dictionary Online, for example,) proves the semantic change interpreted from the case study, that “great” is becoming the core meaning of awesome, and that “terrible” is archaic since it is only active in older members. Based on the cognitive sociolinguistic approach, the overlapping of senses shows diachronic succession (e.g. awesome 'terrible' > 'impressive' > 'great', with 'impressive' as a neutral transition, as opposed to 'terrible' > 'great' ). Additionally, the overlapping readings only occur “as expected” (e.g. the archaic sense of awesome 'terrible' occurs in the adjacent younger generation of its users—age 60 and up, not to the youngest generations.) Socio-cognitive analysis also helps us identify the responsible speakers for innovation as well as speakers who resist innovation: in this case, the age group of 31-60 first started using the sense “great”, and people over 60 are resisting the innovation since some are still using the oldest sense “terrible”.

=== Conclusion of the study ===
The socio-cognitive analysis, as an interdisciplinary perspective, serves to present the systematic relationship between the semantic category fluctuations and the socio-demography of a community. The observations in the case study above contribute to validate the socio-cognitive field. As shown above, it organizes a “conceptual mess” and interpret it in a variationist framework. The complex cognitive polysemy forms regular patterns once it was mapped on the socio-demography of the community. The cognitive sociolinguistic approach, therefore, brings solutions to language research at a methodological and an analytical level (Robinson 2010).

== Cultural models ==
=== Rationalist versus romantic models ===
The rationalist model of language sees language as a logical item. It states that language is strictly a means of communication, an act of social participation, and language variation as an obstacle to emancipation. The romantic model of language understands language as a means of human expression of themselves and their identities. Language variation, according to this model, is also a means to express social exclusion.

	rationalist model	romantic model
linguistic-philosophical basis	language as a medium of communication (TOOL)	language as a medium of expression (SOCIAL MARKER)
conception of standardization and globalization	a democratic ideal: standard/global language as a neutral medium of social participation and emancipation	anti-ideological criticism: standard / global language as a medium of social exclusion and a threat to local identities
conception of language variation	language variation / multilingualism as functional specialization	Language variation / multilingualism as expressing different and layered identities
identity-language link	arbitrary	indexical, favors cognitive linguistic side, but also arbitrary if examined diachronically

=== Cultural cognition ===
Cultural cognition has two integral aspects—conceptualization and language. Lexical, morpho-syntactic and pragmatic differences cross-linguistically or cross-dialectally are often motivated by conceptualizations which manifest cultural norms, knowledge and experiences in history

Even though it is the individual mind that is responsible for the connection of the two, the ultimate level of cultural cognition is not fixed representations in each member's mind, but, at an emergent level, is the properties which arise from interactions among members of a cultural group or a speech community.

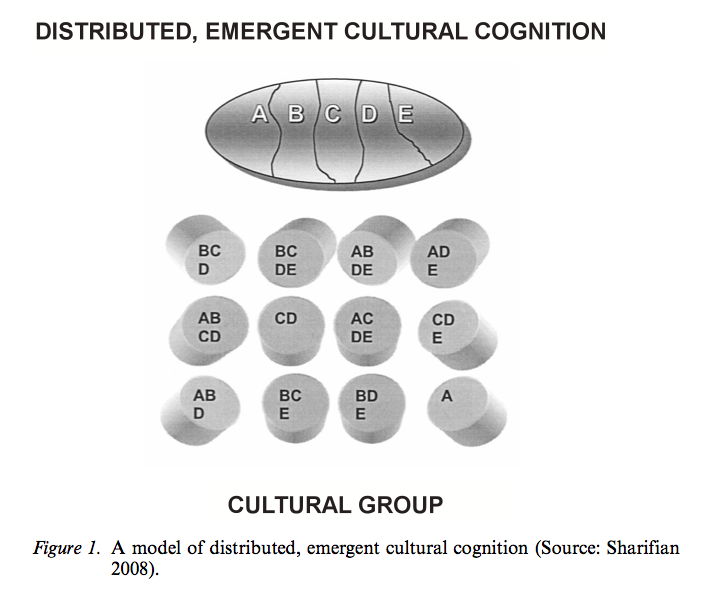
Cognitive Sociolinguistics

The oval section is a representation of cultural cognition on the emergent level. The cognition emerges from the interactions among members of the same group. They may share part of the elements of the collective cultural cognition, as seen in the lower section which reflects the heterogeneous distribution of cultural cognition across individuals’ minds. This is a more dynamic fluid view that goes beyond the individual level of mind and counters the essentialist views of culture.

=== Components of cultural models ===
Cultural models comprises a network of categories, schemas and metaphors:

- Category: x is a kind of y.
- Schema: conceptual knowledge, based on other kinds of relationships (e.g. temporal, spatial, thematic, functional, etc.)

Essentially, cultural models are schemas of a relatively higher degree of complexity.

==== Example of a cultural model: American marriage ====
- Category: wedding gift
- Schema: giving away
- Metaphor: marriage as a journey.

=== Social problem and cultural models ===
A rationalist model: Aboriginal English in Australia

Aboriginal English is a variety of Australian English exhibiting influence from Australian indigenous languages. Studies have shown that the educational systems in Australia subscribe to the rationalist model by promoting the learning of Standard Australian English as the key to success in their society. As a result, there has been miscommunication in school settings, where teachers approach aboriginal students with a standardization mindset. However, cognitive sociolinguists’ effort in this is to present the specific schemas and underlying cultural conceptualizations to account for linguistic differences between the two dialects.

In the study, both the Aboriginal Australian and the Anglo-Australian students were asked to elaborate on the given stimulus word "home". Aboriginal children associated "home" with members of their extended family, family obligations, without much limit of time and space. However, the Anglo-Australian children referred to physical buildings and commodities (e.g. TV) as their "home". The lexical difference resides in the conceptualization difference between the two cultural groups, where Aboriginal people's conceptualizations profile the company of the extended family as opposed to the Anglo-Australian sense of "home" that is usually a building and its contents, bound by space and time.

The study posed implications for improvement of the educational system in Australia. This cognitive sociolinguistic approach brings forth the conflict between the two cultural models –– rationalist and romantic –– and serves to potentially solve the social problem in a community.

A romantic model: Chinese English

Institutionalized second language varieties of English demonstrate the phenomenon of language contact in that it displays the different embodiment of the same language in different speech communities. Instead of considering these varieties as non-standard and evasive, the cognitive sociolinguistic approach is to account for the motivation and underlying reason for the behavior differences in language (as opposed to the structuralists’ view in a Saussurian model where only the "langue", as a self-contained system, is of scientific interest). For example, In Chinese English, metaphorical expressions such as "sons and daughters of the Chinese nation", "our cousins in Mainland China" (used by people from Hong Kong) and "big brother" (referring to a recruiter or protector in a Chinese secret society) express the conceptualization "the nation is a family".

Syntactically, there is construction grammar incorporating Chinese culture such as ancestral worship:

(1) We want to burn a paper woman to Ken [a 22 year old male, who had died], let’s go.
(2) Mr. Wong is so rich, he won’t live a [sic.] small house after his death. So we must burn him a big villa ... I worry that he would feel lonely. So I will burn him two concubines.

In the examples above, the ditransitive or double- object construction (offer somebody something) is here lexically realized by the culturally determined expressions burn somebody (a paper replica of) a villa, which is one of the mourning rituals for the spirits of the deceased.

In dealing with the World Englishes, the cognitive sociolinguistic approach is one that combines corpus linguistic methods these developed in conceptual metaphor theory and blending theory.

== Sociopolitical model ==
The use of language in politics, now and throughout history, plays a significant role in the development of many political issues, controversies, and conflicts. Essentialist and non-essentialist views of language play a crucial role in political discourse in that the definition of a word or concept may be understood as being either too broad or too narrow by one party or another.

One example of such a debacle is the Clinton-Lewinsky scandal of 1998, in which former United States President Bill Clinton was charged with having "sexual relations" with Monica Lewinsky. The definition of "sexual relations" was called into question as the term was ambiguous (i.e. whether "oral sex" should be included or excluded from the definition of "sexual relations"). The President denied the allegations on the grounds that the definition of "sexual relations" given in the legal deposition of the trial did not constitute "oral sex" on the person being deposed.)
