= Bishari tribe =

Bisharin
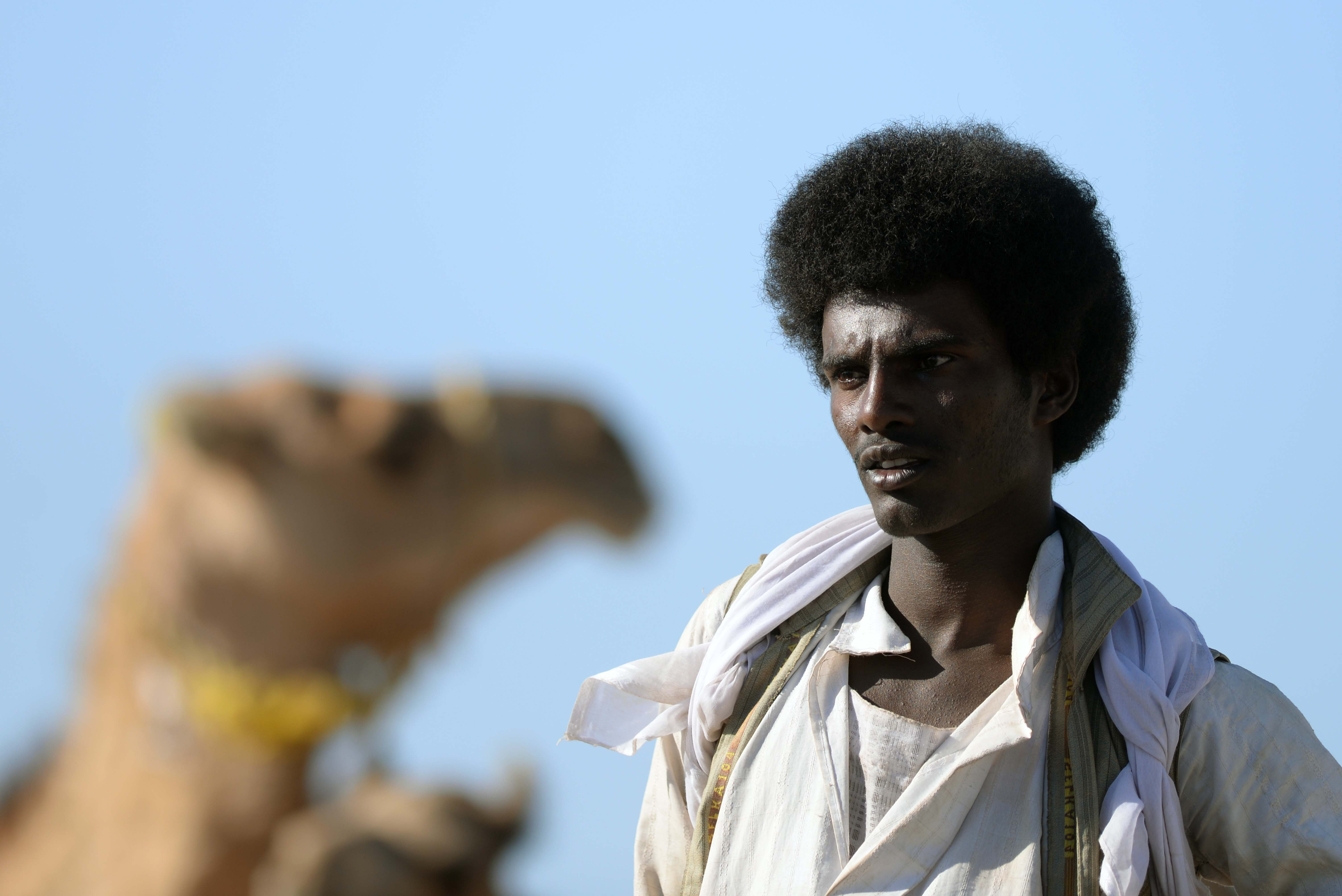
- Bishari man in Gebel Elba

Languages
- Beja (Bidhaawyeet), Arabic

Religion
- Islam

Related ethnic groups
- Other Beja

The Bisharin (Arabic: البشارية, romanized: al-Bishāriyyah, or البشاريين, romanized: al-Bishāriyyīn; Beja: Oobshaariin) are a Beja tribe living in Egypt and Sudan. Apart from local dialects of Arabic, the Bisharin speak the Beja language, which belongs to the Afroasiatic family of the Cushitic branch.

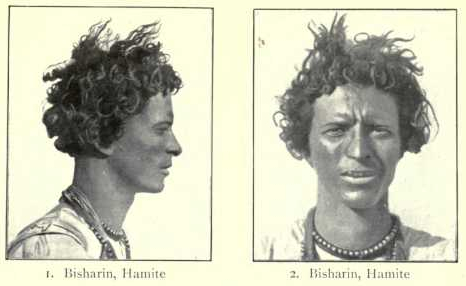
Photo of a Bisharin man from Augustus Henry Keane's Man, Past and Present (1899)

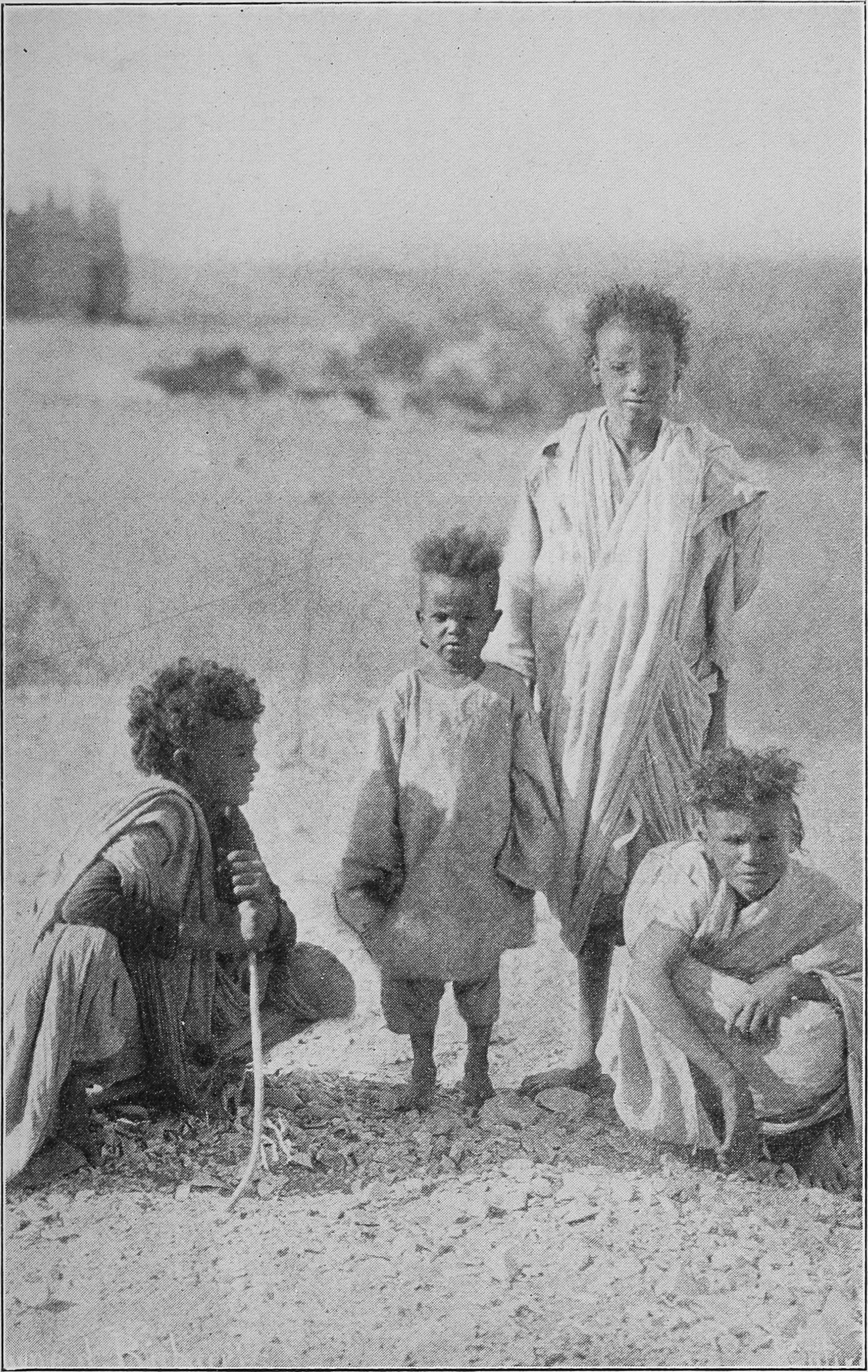
A group of Bishari children, c. 1915.

== Demographics ==
The Bishari live in the eastern part of the Nubian Desert in Sudan and southern Egypt. They reside in the Atabai (also spelled Atbai) area between the Nile River and the Red Sea, north of the Amarar and south of the Ababda people between the Nubian Desert and the Nile Valley, an area of limestone, mountains, with sandstone plateaus.

Most Bisharin move within the territory of Sudan, where members have political representation in the Beja Congress.

== Language ==
The Bishari speak the Beja language as a mother tongue. It belongs to the Cushitic branch of the Afroasiatic family.

The Beja inhabiting Sudan also speak Sudanese Arabic as a second language. In 1949, a member of the Bishari tribe stated that when they meet a stranger, they immediately ask "'Are you biggaweijet (=Bišari) or belaeijt (Arab)?'" and continued "‘...We call our language biggawija and it contains many elements of Arabic (belaeijet).'"

== Economy ==
The Bishari are traditionally nomadic people, working in husbandry of camels, sheep, and goats in the southern part of the Eastern Desert. This area is largely unexplored. Of all the tribes in the area, they live in the more remote areas. The Bishari and the Bishari Qamhatab, believed to be ancient Bishari, have traded agricultural commodities with other people since ancient times.

== Religion ==
The Bishari are mostly Sunni Muslims. In the 10th century CE, the Muslim geographer Al-Maqdisi wrote that the Bishari were Christians. Throughout their history, the Bishari tribes have practised numerous different religions, including varieties of paganism, then Christianity and now Islam. Although they are recognised as Muslims, Islam is not deeply rooted in the culture. Often of equal importance are traditional beliefs. Many continue to fear the influence of jinn, or bad spirits, which they believe are all around and cause sickness and disputes between neighbours.

== See also ==
- Amarar
- Hadendoa
- Beni-Amer people
