= Danijela Stefanović =

Serbian egyptologist

Danijela Stefanović (Serbian Cyrillic: Данијела Стефановић; born 9 July 1973) is a Serbian historian and Egyptologist.

== Career ==
Stefanović is a Professor at the Faculty of Philosophy, University of Belgrade and a researcher in the Department of Egyptology of the University of Vienna, specializing in the history of ancient Egypt and Greece.

== Selected works ==
- The Title mr t3-mḥw in the Middle Kingdom Documents (Serbian Archaeological Society, 2003, ISBN 978-86-904455-0-9).
- The holders of regular military titles in the period of the Middle Kingdom (Golden House, 2006, ISBN 978-0-9550256-6-2).
- The non-royal regular feminine titles of the Middle Kingdom and Second Intermediate Period: dossiers (Golden House, 2009, ISBN 978-1-906137-12-0).
- Dossiers of Ancient Egyptians - the Middle Kingdom and Second Intermediate Period: addition to Franke's 'Personendaten'. With Wolfram Grajetzki (GHP Egyptology 19. London: Golden House Publications. 2012. ISBN 1906137293, 9781906137298)
- I beše poput ptice u kavezu. Studija o istoriji i kulturi Starog istoka (Glasnik, 2012, ISBN 978-86-519-1198-2).
- (Austro-)German Words in Serbian. With Helmut Satzinger (Narodna Biblioteka Srbije Beograd, 2014, ISBN 978-86-7035-322-0).
- Dossiers of Ancient Egyptian Women. The Middle Kingdom and Second Intermediate Period. (Middle Kingdom Studies 5). London 2016. ISBN 978-1906137519.
- Pouka za Merikarea: staroegipatski traktat o vlasti [A Lesson for Mericarae: Ancient Egyptian Treatise on Power] Belgrade: Evoluta, 2018. ISBN 978-86-80912-20-2.
- Stelae of the Middle Kingdom and the Second Intermediate Period: Ägyptisches Museum und Papyrussammlung, Staatliche Museen zu Berlin, 2019, with Helmut Satzinger, London ISBN 978-1906137632.
