= Martine Vanhove =

French linguist

Martine Vanhove is a French linguist, Research Director emerita at LLACAN (CNRS), specializing in Cushitic and Semitic languages spoken in Djibouti, Yemen and Malta.

== Education and research ==
Vanhove earned her PhD in 1990 from the Université Sorbonne-Nouvelle, Paris 3, with a dissertation entitled, Morphosyntaxe et stylistique en maltais: Le système verbal et la phrase nominale, under the supervision of David Cohen. In 2002 she earned her Habilitation (INALCO), with a Habilitation thesis entitled, Pour une linguistique dynamique: Contribution aux études chamito-sémitiques; Dialectologie arabe (Malte, Yémen) et langues couchitiques (afar, bedja).

She joined the CNRS in 1992 and was affiliated with LLACAN from 1995 until her retirement in 2022. She was Director of LLACAN from 2007 to 2013. Her research interests include information structure, (lexical) semantics and lexical typology, areal linguistics and comparative Semitic. She also was involved in co-editing a Corpus of AfroAsiatic, and an important volume (Mettouchi et al. 2015) of studies based on this language corpus.

== Honors and awards ==
Vanhove is a member of the Academia Europaea since 2019. In 2009 she was the President of the Linguistic Society of Paris.

== Selected publications ==
- Adamou, Evangelia, Katharina Haude & Martine Vanhove (eds.) 2018. Information Structure in Lesser-described Languages: Studies in prosody and syntax. Benjamins. DOI: https://doi.org/10.1075/slcs.199
- Koptjevskaja-Tamm, Maria, Ekaterina Rakhilina, and Martine Vanhove. 2016. The Semantics of Lexical Typology. In Nick Riemer (ed.), The Routledge Handbook of Semantics, 434–454. London, New York: Routledge.
- Mettouchi, Amina, Martine Vanhove & Dominique Caubet (eds). 2015. Corpus-based Studies of Lesser-Described Languages: The CorpAfroAs Corpus of Spoken AfroAsiatic. Amsterdam, Philadelphia: John Benjamins.
- Simeone-Senelle, Marie-Claude & Martine Vanhove. 2006. Is there a Red Sea linguistic area? APAL (Annual Publication in African Linguistics) 4, 31–67.
- Vanhove, Martine. 1995. A propos du verbe dans les dialectes arabes de Yafi‘ (Yémen). Dialectologia Arabica. A Collection of Articles in Honour of the Sixtieth Birthday of Professor Heikki Palva. Special issue of Studia Orientalia: 257–269.
- Vanhove, Martine. 2017. Le Beja. Leuven, Paris : Peeters.
- Vanhove, Martine, Stolz, Thomas, Urdze, Aina and Otsuka, Hitomi (eds.). 2012. Morphologies in Contact. Berlin: Akademie Verlag. https://doi.org/10.1524/9783050057699
