= Maria Koptjevskaja-Tamm =

Russian linguist (born 1957)

Maria Koptjevskaja-Tamm (born 1957) is a Russian-born linguist and typologist who is Professor of General Linguistics at Stockholm University.

== Biography ==
Originally from Moscow, Koptjevskaja-Tamm's interest in linguistics was stimulated when as a teenager she participated in the Moscow Linguistics Olympiad, winning a medal. She graduated from Moscow State University in 1979 and moved to Sweden in 1980, where she received her PhD in linguistics from Stockholm University in 1988. After working as a researcher on a project on part-of-speech systems in the world's languages, she was appointed docent in linguistics at Stockholm University in 1993, and was promoted to full professor in 2001.

== Research ==
Koptjevskaja-Tamm carries out research in the field of linguistic typology, focusing on syntax and semantics. Her 2002 monograph on the structure and use of nominalizations across the world's languages is widely cited. Empirically her work has often focused on the Circum-Baltic languages, which include Baltic, Balto-Finnic, Germanic and Slavic languages. In 2015 she published a volume on how languages encode and conceptualize temperature.

== Honors ==
Koptjevskaja-Tamm was elected as member of the Academia Europaea in 2010.

Since 2018 she has been editor-in-chief of the journal Linguistic Typology.

== Selected publications ==
- Dahl, Östen and Maria Koptjevskaja-Tamm. 2001. Kinship in grammar. In Irène Baron, Michael Herslund and Finn Sørensen (eds.), Dimensions of possession, 201–226. Amsterdam: John Benjamins. doi:10.1075/tsl.47.12dah
- Dahl, Östen and Maria Koptjevskaja-Tamm (eds.). 2001. Circum-Baltic languages, vol. 1: Past and present. Amsterdam: John Benjamins. ISBN 9789027230577
- Dahl, Östen and Maria Koptjevskaja-Tamm (eds.). 2001. Circum-Baltic languages, vol. 2: Grammar and typology. Amsterdam: John Benjamins. ISBN 9789027230591
- Koptjevskaja-Tamm, Maria. 2001. “A piece of the cake” and “a cup of tea”: Partitive and pseudo-partitive nominal constructions in the Circum-Baltic languages. In Dahl & Koptjevskaja-Tamm (eds.), vol. 2, 523–568. doi:10.1075/slcs.55.11kop
- Koptjevskaja-Tamm, Maria. 2002. Nominalizations. London: Routledge. ISBN 9781138994508
- Koptjevskaja-Tamm, Maria. 2003. Possessive noun phrases in the languages of Europe. In Frans Plank (ed.), Noun phrase structure in the languages of Europe, 621–722. Berlin: Mouton de Gruyter. doi:10.1515/9783110197075.4.621
- Koptjevskaja-Tamm, Maria. 2008. Approaching lexical typology. In Martine Vanhove (ed.), From Polysemy to Semantic Change: Towards a typology of lexical semantic associations, 3–52. Amsterdam: John Benjamins. doi:10.1075/slcs.106.03kop
- Koptjevskaja-Tamm, Maria (ed.). 2015. The linguistics of temperature. Amsterdam: John Benjamins. ISBN 9789027206886
