= Helmut Satzinger =

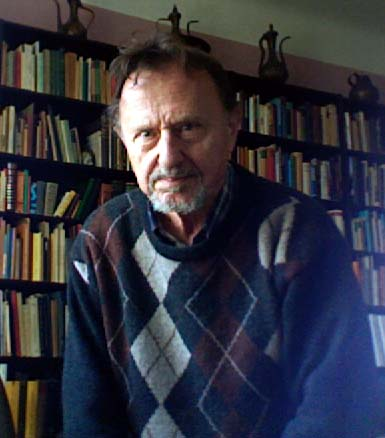
- Born: January 21, 1938 (age 88); Linz

Helmut Satzinger (born January 21, 1938, in Linz) is an Austrian Egyptologist and Coptologist. He studied Egyptology, Arabic Philology and African Languages at the University of Vienna and, for 1 year, at Cairo University. Immediately after obtaining his PhD degree in 1964, he became commissioned to catalogue and publish Coptic papyri in the West Berlin section of the Egyptian Museum of Berlin.

Five years later, he was appointed Assistant Curator at the Egyptian and Near Eastern Collection of the Kunsthistorisches Museum in Vienna and in 1977 he became the Head of the department.

In 1978, he was attested the qualification for academic lecturing (habilitation) in Egyptology at the University of Vienna. Since then, he has been regularly giving courses, mainly in Middle Egyptian, Late Egyptian, and Egyptian Epigraphy, Art, and Museology, at the University of Vienna, but also at the University of Hamburg (1980), LMU Munich (1993), at Cairo University (2000), and at the University of Belgrade (2004, 2005). He supervised more than forty Egyptological and Coptological theses (PhD and MA). Satzinger retired from his curatorial work in 2003.

Until then, his Egyptological research activities were evenly distributed between the museum (catalogues, epigraphic publications, etc.) and linguistics and (or) philology, in the main Egyptian and Coptic. Of late, he intensified his research in Afro-Asiatic language relations.

== Books ==
- Egyptian Root Lexicon. With Danijela Stefanović. Hamburg, 2021. ISBN 9783943955255
- Is there not one among you who understands Egyptian? The Late Egyptian Language: Structure of its Grammar. Golden House Publications, London 2020. ISBN 9781906137670
- Stelae of the Middle Kingdom and the Second Intermediate Period: Ägyptisches Museum und Papyrussammlung, Staatliche Museen zu Berlin, with Danijela Stefanović, London 2019. ISBN 978-1906137632
- (Austro-)German Words in Serbian. With Danijela Stefanović. Beograd 2014.
- Hieroglyphische Inschriften aus der ägyptischen Spätzeit. Mainz, 2013.
- Stelen, Inschriftsteine und Reliefs aus der Zeit der 18. Dynastie. With Michaela Hüttner. Mainz 1999.
- Stelen des Mittleren Reiches einschließlich der I. und II. Zwischenzeit. Part II. With Irmgard Hein. Mainz 1993.
- Stelen des Mittleren Reiches einschließlich der I. und II. Zwischenzeit. Part I. With Irmgard Hein. Mainz, 1989.
- Urkunden der 18. Dynastie. Indices zu den Heften 1–22. With Monika Hasitzka. Berlin 1988.
- Neuägyptische Studien. Die Partikel ir - Das Tempussystem. Vienna, 1976.
- Die negativen Konstruktionen im Alt- und Mittelägyptischen. Berlin, 1968.
- Koptische Urkunden III. Ägyptische Urkunden aus den Staatlichen Museen Berlin. Berlin, 1968.
- Kunsthistorisches Museum Vienna. With Monika Randl. Utrecht 2002. (CD-ROM; Egyptian Treasures in Europe vol. 5.)
- Das Kunsthistorische Museum in Wien: Die Ägyptisch-Orientalische Sammlung. Mainz, 1994.
- Ägyptisch-Orientalische Sammlung des Kunsthistorischen Museums. Magazinpresse, München 1987.
- Ägyptische Kunst in Wien. Wien 1980.

== Further publications ==
Several museum and exhibition catalogues, and presentations of the Vienna Egyptian collection and its history. More than 200 articles on Egyptological and Coptological issues, Afro-Asiatic languages, Old Nubian, etc.; some sixty book reviews.

== Studies in Honour of Helmut Satzinger ==
- Roman Gundacker—Julia Budka—Gabriele Pieke (eds.): Florilegium Aegyptiacum. Eine wissenschaftliche Blütenlese von Schülern und Freunden für Helmut Satzinger zum 75. Geburtstag (= Göttinger Miszellen, Beiheft 14), Wien 2013.
- Monika R. M. Hasitzka—Johannes Diethart—Günther Dembski (eds.), Das alte Ägypten und seine Nachbarn. Festschrift zum 65. Geburtstag von Helmut Satzinger, mit Beiträgen zur Ägyptologie, Koptologie, Nubiologie und Afrikanistik. Krems, 2003.
