= Siyal Islands =

Island group in the Red Sea

Disputed island Native name: Jazā’ir Siyāl
- Interactive map of Siyal Islands

Geography
- Location: Red Sea
- Coordinates: 22°47′25″N 36°12′48″E
- Total islands: 3
- Major islands: Siyal El Kabir (largest), two others (unnamed)
- Area: 2 km^{2} (0.77 sq mi)
- Highest elevation: 2.4 m (7.9 ft)
- Highest point: unnamed point

Administration
- Egypt
- Governorate: Red Sea

Claimed by
- Sudan
- State: Red Sea

Demographics
- Population: no permanent population
- Ethnic groups: Huteimi

The Siyal Islands are a group of islands off the coast of northeastern Africa, located in the Red Sea. The islands are located in the Halaib Triangle, which is claimed by both Sudan and Egypt, as part of an ongoing border dispute. Since the 1990s, the islands have been occupied by Egypt, and so the islands are de facto administered by Egypt. They remain, however, to be claimed by Sudan.

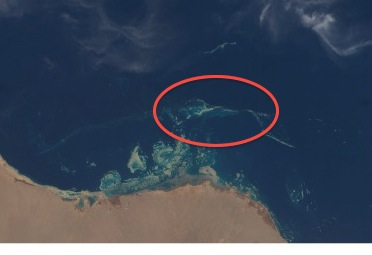
Siyal Islands from space

== Environment ==
The islands are surrounded by rocks and coral, and have a sandy surface with scant marine vegetation. The local fishermen, descendants of the Huteimi peoples identified by J. R. Wellsted, harvest turtle and bird eggs from the surrounding area. The islands are part of the Elba Protected Area of Egypt, and are home to white-eyed gulls, with an estimated maximum of seventy individuals, as well as several ospreys. They have been designated an Important Bird Area (IBA) by BirdLife International.
