= Shalateen =

Largest town in the Halaib Triangle

Shalateen شلاتين
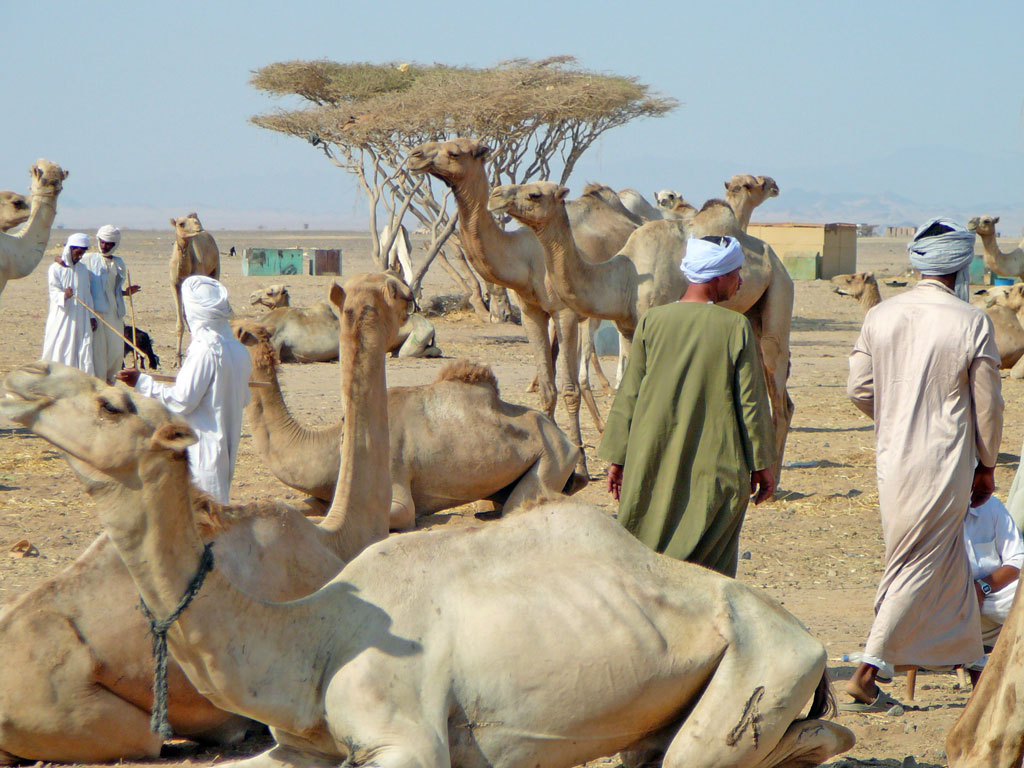
- Camel market in Shalateen

- Location in the Halaib Triangle Shalateen (Sudan)
- Coordinates: 23°7′54″N 35°35′8″E
- Country: De jure Disputed area between: Egypt; Sudan De facto Administered by: Egypt
- Governorate: Red Sea Governorate (Egypt)
- State: Red Sea State (Sudan)
- Time zone: UTC+2 (EET)
  - Summer (DST): UTC+3 (EEST)

Shalateen (Arabic: شلاتين Šalatayn, Egyptian Arabic: [ʃælæˈtiːn]; also spelled Shalatin and Shalatayn) is the biggest town in the Halaib Triangle, a disputed territory claimed by Egypt. It is 520 km (320 mi) south of Hurghada and is controlled as the administrative center (markaz) of all Egyptian territory up to the border between Egypt and Sudan, including the villages of:

- Abu Ramad, 125 km (78 mi) to the southeast;
- Halaib, 165 km (103 mi) to the southeast;
- Ras Hadarba 200 km (120 mi) to the southeast. Ras Hadarba or Cape Hadarba lies on the shores of the Red Sea to the southeast of the city of Halayib and to the east of mount Hadarba from which it takes its name. The village of Ras Hadarba lies just north of the borders between Egypt and the Sudan which run along the 22 degree north parallel of latitude;
- Marsa Hameera, 40 km (25 mi) to the north; and
- Abrak, 90 km (56 mi) to the west.

The first three of the above towns (Abu Ramad, Halayib and Ras Hadarba) are located within the disputed Hala'ib Triangle.

The population of Shalateen is estimated at 23,554 people and is inhabited by the Bisharin (Al Bishareya) and Ababda (Al Ababda) sub tribes of the Beja people.

== History ==
Egyptian ministries and authorities are in the process of establishing their presence in the area and operate in conjunction with the City Council to provide services to the local communities according to the policies and programs of their respective organizations. The military is responsible for security and law enforcement in the Halayib Triangle. Red Sea Governorate's Popular Council, including many members from the Bishari tribe and the Ababda people, are responsible for determining what the local people need and supporting local participation in management and development of this area.

The Egyptian government also provides additional social services to the local communities, such as food, water, monetary assistance, subsidies, health care, veterinary care, housing and education. A new international Airport in Marsa Alam was built, about 270 kilometres (170 mi) from Shalateen city, which Egyptian policy makers intend to be the center of more development for the southern region included the Shalateen area.

== Climate ==
Köppen-Geiger climate classification system classifies its climate as a hot desert (BWh).

Climate data for Shalateen
Month	Jan	Feb	Mar	Apr	May	Jun	Jul	Aug	Sep	Oct	Nov	Dec	Year
Mean daily maximum °C (°F)	25.5 (77.9)	26.5 (79.7)	28.3 (82.9)	31.7 (89.1)	34.7 (94.5)	36.5 (97.7)	37.4 (99.3)	37.4 (99.3)	36.1 (97.0)	33.9 (93.0)	30.4 (86.7)	26.8 (80.2)	32.1 (89.8)
Daily mean °C (°F)	19.7 (67.5)	20.4 (68.7)	22.2 (72.0)	25.3 (77.5)	28.5 (83.3)	30 (86)	31.3 (88.3)	31.5 (88.7)	30.2 (86.4)	28.1 (82.6)	24.7 (76.5)	21.3 (70.3)	26.1 (79.0)
Mean daily minimum °C (°F)	14 (57)	14.3 (57.7)	16.1 (61.0)	18.9 (66.0)	22.4 (72.3)	23.6 (74.5)	25.3 (77.5)	25.6 (78.1)	24.4 (75.9)	22.3 (72.1)	19.1 (66.4)	15.8 (60.4)	20.2 (68.2)
Average precipitation mm (inches)	0 (0)	0 (0)	0 (0)	1 (0.0)	0 (0)	0 (0)	0 (0)	0 (0)	0 (0)	2 (0.1)	9 (0.4)	2 (0.1)	14 (0.6)
Source: Climate-Data.org

== Ethnography ==
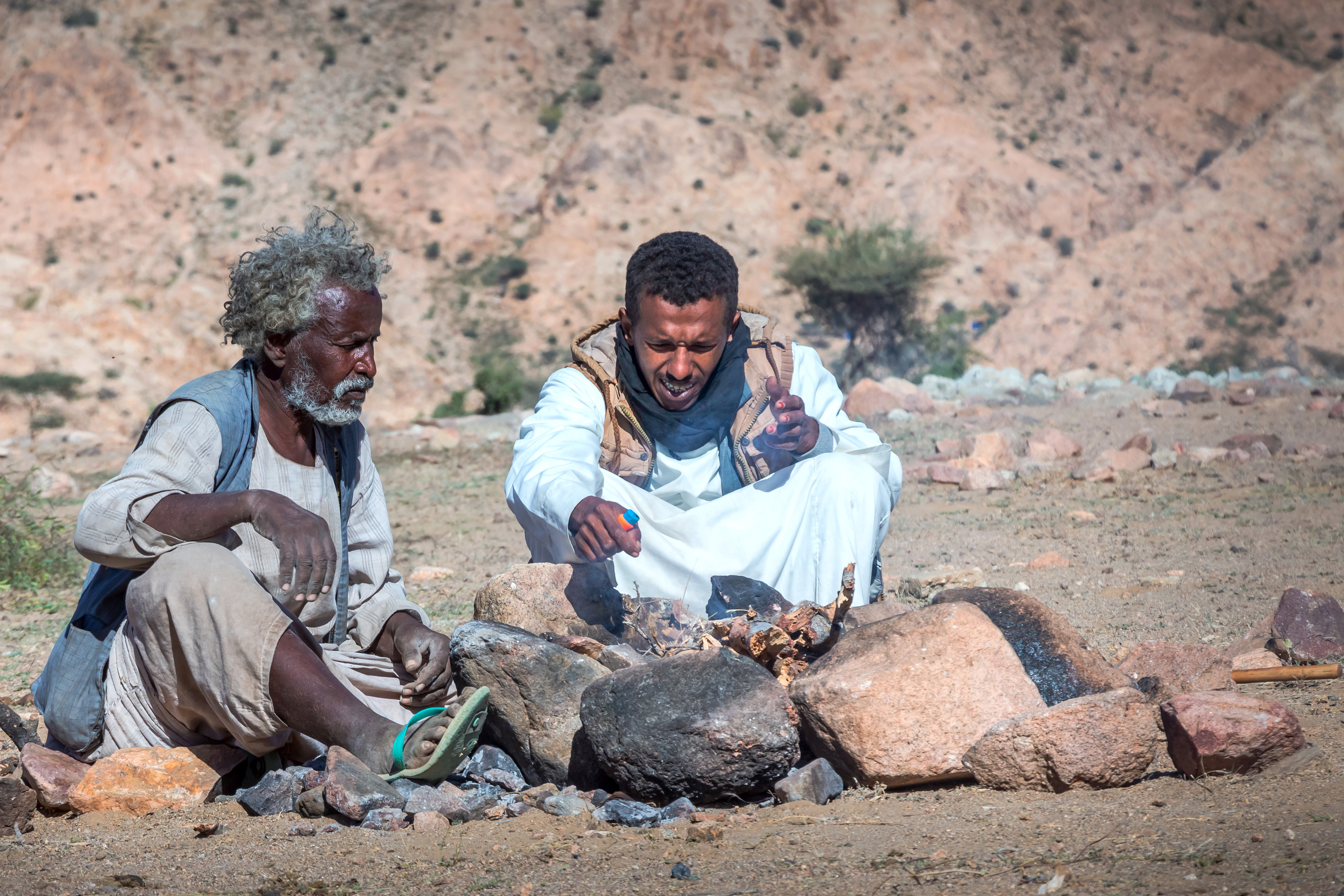
People of the mountains

Local tribes in Halayib and Shalateen area have had little exposure to modernization under Sudanese administration and under Egyptian administration up to 1992. But after 1992, the Egyptian government started to implement a development plan when it started to build some settlements, including 500 new houses built in Shalateen and 250 in Aboramad and Halayib, depending on Shalateen local council sources. Roads were also established, including a 250-kilometer road between Shalateen and Marsa Alam city in north, and three new electricity generators have begun operation since 1993. In 1993–94, the Egyptian government launched a plan for the social economic development of the area. Services and economic support were delivered in the main towns and villages and necessary infrastructures was built. Financial and in-kind donations were sponsored for a total amount of 1.5 billion L.E. currently; the government is supporting local families with 70 L.E. per month, and 3 L.E. per day to each child going to school. Nowadays many highly educated people, and many local people, work as employees of the government, NGOs and private sector companies.

Depending on that and on the government development policy, many people from the mountains moved to towns in order to benefit from these services. They were given houses with a permanent water source, food supplies, electricity and education. So far, approximately 8,000 people have settled along the coast. As a result of the plan, communities in the urban areas have improved their livelihood.

The local community in Halayib area has been involved in the management of Gabal Elba Protected Area as guides and also as environmental researchers in the management and conservation of the natural resources of this area; local people are also involved in the decision-making process. The World Food Programme project in this area "Support Bedouin Life Project" represents a good model for the Egyptian government's policy of local participation and community-based management of projects.

The languages spoken there varies on local Beja, Arabic and English languages.
