= ʿAydhab =

Medieval port on the west coast of the Red Sea

ʿAydhab عَيذاب
- Location in the Halaib Triangle
- Coordinates: 22°19′51″N 36°29′25″E
- Country: De jure Disputed area between: Egypt; Sudan De facto Administered by: Egypt
- Governorate: Red Sea Governorate (Egypt)
- State: Red Sea State (Sudan)

ʿAydhab (Arabic: عَيذاب, also Aidab) was an important medieval port on the west coast of the Red Sea. The abandoned site of the town is located in the Halaib Triangle, a territory disputed between Egypt and the Sudan.

== History ==
ʿAydhab was occupied by the Beja before its conquest by Fatimid Egypt in the 10th century. It was located about 20 km north of the modern port Halaib. Abulfeda gave its coordinates as 21°N, 58°E: it is actually located at 22°19'N, 36°28'E. The site was identified in January 1896 by the English explorer Theodore Bent.

ʿAydhab became an important port for eastern trade (particularly with Yemen) and for Muslim pilgrims from Africa on their way to Mecca during the 10th and 11th centuries for a number of reasons. First, the rediscovery of the Egyptian mines of the Wadi Allaqi led to a gold rush between the 10th and 14th centuries. Second, the establishment of the Fatimid caliphate increased the relative importance of Egypt in Middle Eastern trade, while piracy and instability in the Persian Gulf moved more international trade into the Red Sea. This had to be located far down the coast because steady southerly winds made it difficult for large ships to travel to Suez before the age of steam.

ʿAydhab was close to Jiddah and linked by a regular ferry; caravans connected it to Aswan and other cities on the Nile. The travellers ibn Jubayr and ibn Battuta both passed through the town. Maimonides's brother David drowned on his way from ʿAydhab to India. Nasir Khusraw believed the region to have the best camels in the world.

The town's customs were divided between the Banyan merchants and the Beja nomads, who in turn protected the town and merchants.

The town was sacked by the crusader Raynald of Châtillon in 1182 and by King David I of Makuria around 1270. The retaliatory sack of Dongola by the Sultan Baibars brought Makuria under a short-lived Egyptian vassalage.

The town declined as the end of the Crusades and development of Suakin increased competition with other ports. In 1326, the well-known traveller Ibn Battuta intended to travel from Egypt to Mecca via 'Aydhab - which was at the time considered the least-travelled of three possible routes. However, upon approaching ʿAydhab he was forced to turn back due to a local rebellion, return to Cairo and go to Mecca by a different route. Ibn Battuta also mentioned that one-third of the city belonged to the Sultan of Egypt, while two-thirds belonged to the King of the Beja, known as al-Ḥadrabi.

After the rise of the Mamluks, Jiddah received preferential treatment for Indian trade.

Finally, in 1426, the Mamluk sultan Barsbay destroyed the town in reprisal for plundering of goods en route to Mecca. The inhabitants of the town fled to Dongola and Suakin, but were massacred in the latter. This was part of Barsbay's campaign to secure for Egypt the exclusive rights over the Red Sea trade between Yemen and Europe.

The former port of the town no longer exists, and the site has been abandoned.
