= Federal Alliance of Eastern Sudan =

East-Sudanese rebel group

The Federal Alliance of East Sudan (FAES) (Arabic: التحالف الفيدرالي لشرق السودان, romanized: altahaluf alfidraliu lisharq alsuwdan) is a splinter group of the largely defunct Eastern Front, a military coalition composed of the Beja Congress and the Rashaida Free Lions primarily formed due to the inability to address their regional concerns through peaceful means.

== History ==
Chronic poverty and marginalization in East Sudan, exacerbated by neglect from the central government, have led to the formation of rebel groups such as FAES, who advocate for equal development opportunities and economic redistribution.

FAES broke away from the Eastern Front coalition as it rejected the Eastern Sudan Peace Agreement (ESPA) signed in June 2006 by the coalition with Omar al-Bashir's regime, sponsored by Eritrea. Under the agreement, the Eastern Front would be given three high-ranking positions in Khartoum and also ten legislative seats in each of the three states in East Sudan: Kassala, Al-Qadarif, and Red Sea. The FAES criticized former allies once part of the Eastern Front who joined national or regional government institutions, accusing them of serving the interests of the ruling party, the National Congress Party.

By February 7, 2007, the Eastern Front had registered as a political party. However, FAES claims that the peace agreement only normalizes bilateral relations between Sudan and Eritrea without tackling the problems and concerns of the Eastern Sudanese people or promoting economic development within the region.

On January 8, 2011, the rebel group merged with the Darfuri Justice and Equality Movement (JEM), driven by a dual desire to end the domination of the central regions and the National Congress Party (NCP), Bashir's party, and to join the JEM's inclusive national vision that represents the diversity of Sudan. By merging with JEM, FAES aligned itself with a broader national movement which will more adequately address their regional concerns. With a unified opposition against the government in Khartoum, concerns have been raised about an Arab Spring-like situation occurring in Sudan as well.

Prior to the merger deal, eight months ago, both rebel groups had engaged in joint military operations against the Sudanese government, receiving backing from Eritrea at the time. This shared cooperation between the two facilitated merger talks and strengthened their alliance against the Bashir regime. As part of the merger agreement, 270 FAES soldiers, along with five members of FAES' leadership council, joined JEM. Secretary General Adam Abdalla Yahia indicated more of the rebel group's membership would join JEM in the future.
