= Musa Mohamed Ahmed =

Sudanese politician

Assistant to the President of Sudan
- In office ?–?

Personal details
- Occupation: Politician

Musa Mohamed Ahmed is a Sudanese politician who was an Assistant to the President of Sudan. He was also the leader of Eastern Front, a rebel group based in eastern Sudan. The Beja Congress (Ahmed's group) and the Free Lions Movement (Mabrouk Mubarak Salim's group) merged to create the movement. The Eastern Front began negotiations in May 2006 with the Sudanese Government and concluded them on 14 October 2006 with the signing of a peace agreement. This took place in Asmara, Eritrea.

In December 2014 Ahmed, as head of Beja Congress, called on the ruling National Congress Party to postpone the 2015 Sudanese general election until a more comprehensive constitutional settlement had been reached.

In 2017 Ahmed was reconfirmed in his role as presidential assistant.
