= Amr Hanafi =

- عمرو حنفي
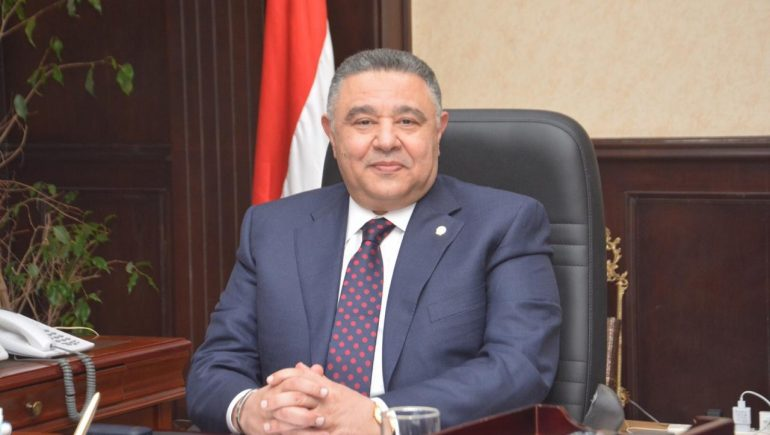
- Hanafi in 2021

Governor of Red Sea Governorate
- In office November 27, 2019 – February 16, 2026

Deputy Director of the General Intelligence Service
- In office 2015–2018

Personal details
- Born: March 2, 1963 (age 63) Red Sea Governorate, Egypt

Amr Hanafi (Arabic: عمرو حنفي) and also spelled Amr Hanafy is an Egyptian politician who served as the governor of Red Sea Governorate from 2019 to 2026.

== Biography ==
Hanafi was born on March 2, 1963, in Red Sea Governorate, Egypt. Between 2015 and 2018, Hanafi served as a deputy director for the General Intelligence Service (GIS), and played a key role in mediation between Egypt and Palestine. He is a major-general.

Hanafi was appointed governor of Red Sea Governorate on November 27, 2019, succeeding Ahmed Abdullah, who was suffering from health issues. He worked with Germany to expand educational and tourism opportunities in the governorate in late 2019. In January 2026, Hanafi opened up new service projects, including a blood bank, in Hurghada. In February 2026, Hanafi was dismissed as governor and succeeded by Walid Abdel-Azim Ibrahim al-Barqi.
