= Ar Kaweit =

Town in Red Sea, Sudan

Ar Kaweit أركويت
- Location in Sudan
- Coordinates: 18°46′59.35490″N 37°6′25.57447″E
- Country: Sudan
- State: Red Sea
- City: Port Sudan
- Highest elevation: 1,200 m (3,900 ft)
- Lowest elevation: 1,000 m (3,300 ft)
- Time zone: Central Africa Time, GMT + 3

Ar Kaweit (Arabic: أركويت), also spelled as Arkawit or Erkowit, is a small town in eastern Sudan. It is around 40 kilometres (25 mi) from the Red Sea and around 90–95 kilometres (56–59 mi) from Sudan's 2nd largest city, Port Sudan. It is at a 1,000–1,200 metres (3,300–3,900 ft) elevation sitting atop a flat mountain. Nearby towns are Carthago, Sinkat, and Gebeit. It is also approximately 470 kilometres (290 mi) from the Nile River. It has a mosque, a school, and a park near it.

On 25 November 1942, a Royal Air Force crashed near Ar Kaweit. The crew set out from Wadi Gazouza Airport for a training exercise. Regrettably, the aircraft did not make it back, and on 31 December, its wreckage was located near Ar Kaweit. This incident resulted in the loss of all three crew members: Sgt Clive Colin Dunstone, Sgt John Skinner, and Sgt James Murray Thomson.
