= Abu Ramad =

Abu Ramad أبو رماد
- Location in the Halaib Triangle Abu Ramad (Sudan)
- Coordinates: 22°23′33″N 36°23′36″E
- Country: De jure Disputed area between: Egypt; Sudan De facto Administered by: Egypt
- Governorate: Red Sea Governorate (Egypt)
- State: Red Sea State (Sudan)
- Time zone: UTC+2 (EET)
  - Summer (DST): UTC+3 (EEST)

Abu Ramad (Arabic: أبو رماد, romanized: 'abū Ramād [æbuɾæˈmæd], "ashy one") is a town located in the Halaib Triangle, a 20,580 km2 (7,950 sq mi) area disputed between Egypt and the Sudan. It is currently de facto administered by Egypt.
