= Eastern Arab Corps =

Sudanese military unit

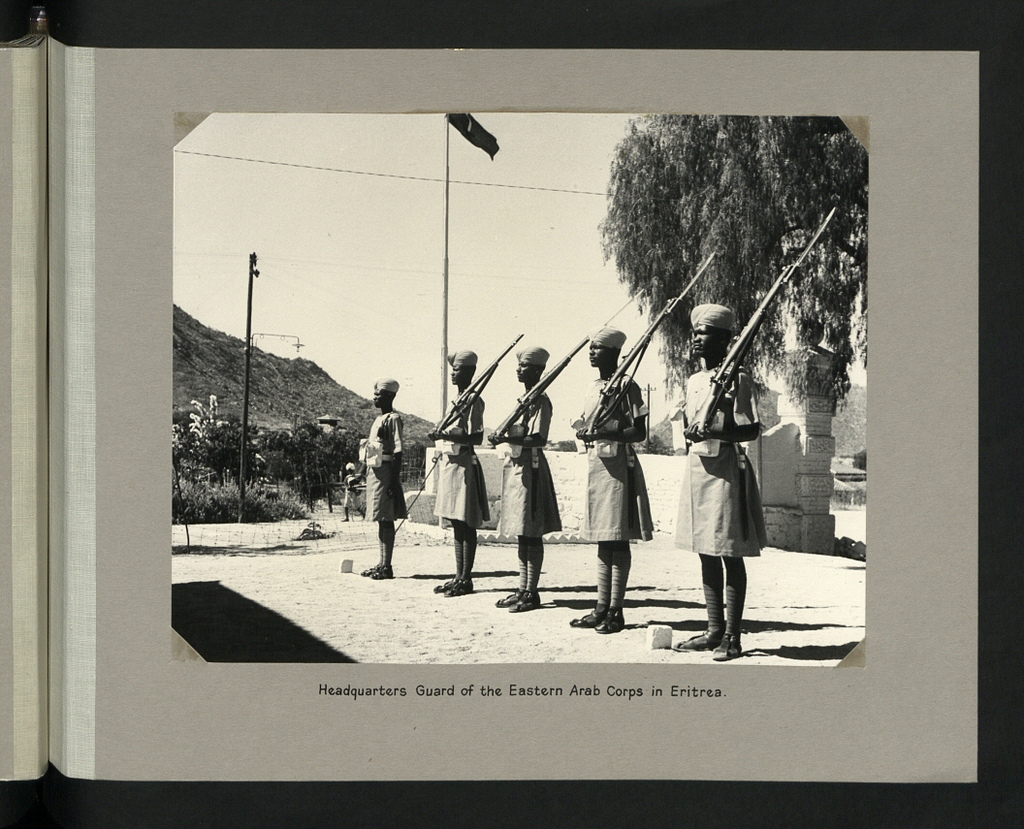
- Active: Founded in the late 19th century
- Country: Sudan
- Allegiance: Sudan Defence Force
- Engagements: East African campaign

Commanders
- Notable commanders: Mohammed Mahmoud Effendi

The Eastern Arab Corps was an armed unit that formed the nucleus of the modern-day Sudanese Armed Forces. Founded by Beni Amer tribesmen in Eastern Sudan during the late 19th century, the Eastern Arab Corps emerged as a formidable armed unit with bases in Kassala and Gedaref respectively.

== Introduction ==
The Eastern Arab Corps represents a key institution in the formation and development of the Sudanese Armed Forces. Originating in the 1890s as a founding unit of the Sudan Defence Force, the Eastern Arab Corps was spearheaded by Beni Amer tribesmen of the Eastern Sudan. The insignia of the Eastern Arab Corps was the Shotal, a famous curved dagger used in Eastern Sudan.

== Structure ==
With bases strategically located in Kassala and Gedaref, the Eastern Arab Corps was composed of infantry, mounted (horseback and camel company), and machine gun units to address a range of military challenges. The Eastern Arab Corps operated with two distinct sub-units, the Idara and Hagana. These units undertook missions ranging from maintaining internal order in the country, patrolling the borders with neighbouring nations and actively participating in international warfare such as the East African campaign. During World War II, the Eastern Arab Corps was involved in warfare on the global stage, as it actively took part in the East African campaign against the Italians. The opening days of the conflict belongs to the Eastern Arab Corps as it was staged in their country, and the opening blows were rightly theirs to strike.
