= James Raymond Wellsted =

Indian navy lieutenant

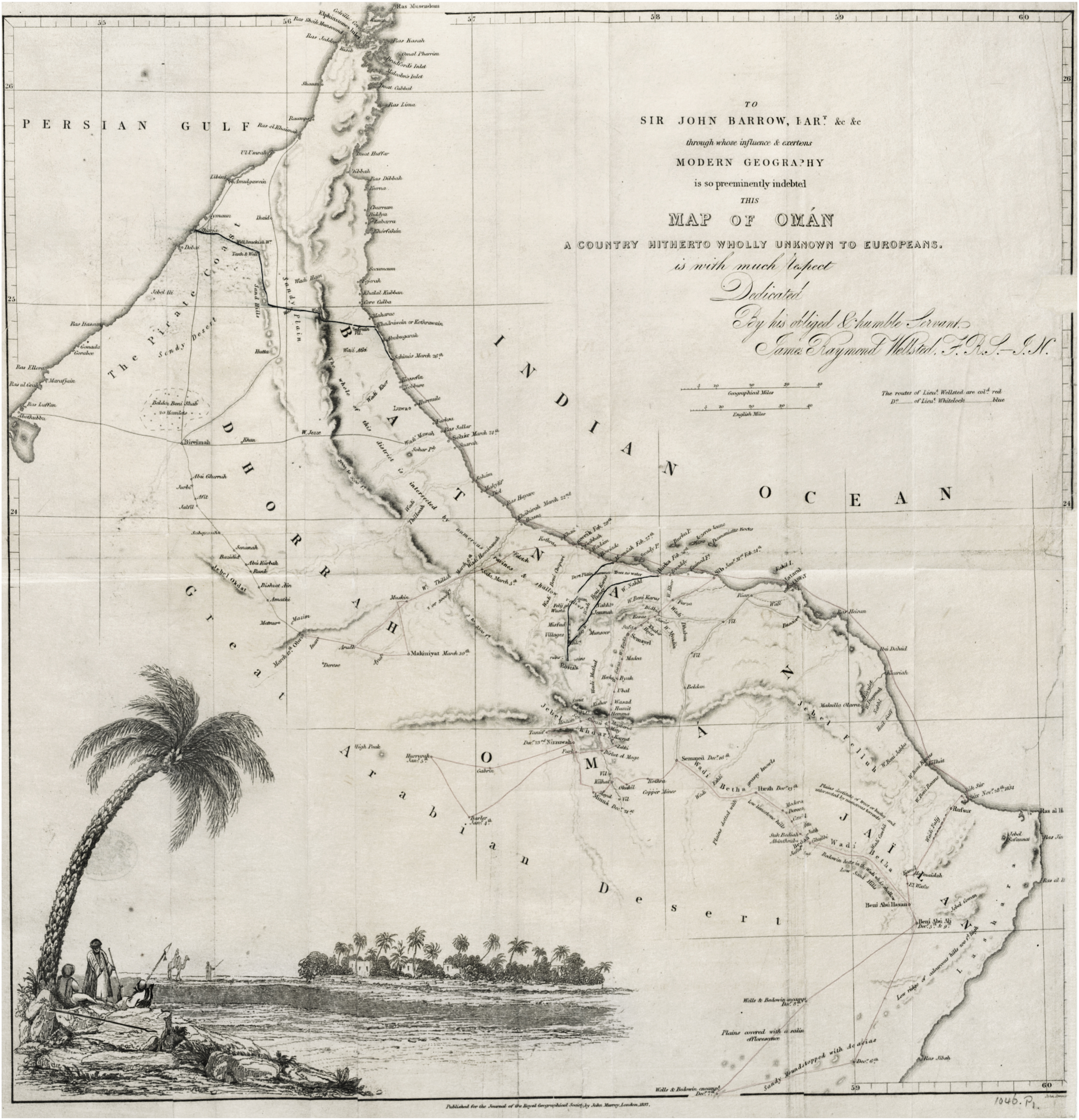
Map of Oman by Wellsted (1838)

James Raymond Wellsted (1805–1842) was a lieutenant in the Indian navy who travelled extensively on the Arabian Peninsula in the 1830s.

== Travels ==
As second lieutenant on the East India Company's survey brig Palinurus under Captain Robert Moresby, Wellsted took part in the detailed survey of the Gulf of 'Aqabah and the northern part of the Red Sea in 1830. He then returned to Bombay in 1833 and was reassigned under the command of Captain Stafford B. Haines to survey the southern coast of Arabia. In January 1834 Palinurus crossed over to Socotra and Wellsted spent two months on the island. He published the results of his journey as Memoir on the island of Socotra.

During his travels to the Red Sea and the Siyal Islands, Wellsted documented the existence of peoples known as the Huteimi. They are described by Wellsted to be "found on the Arabian and Nubian coasts," and that they are "cowardly in disposition, squalid and misshapen in form, and filthy in their habits." According to various accounts, they are further described as a race of fishermen, found in various parts of the Hejaz, with "large encampments near Leyt to the southward of Jiddah."

In November 1835 Wellsted gained permission from the Imam to travel in Oman with Lieutenant F Whitelock. The two reached areas previously unseen by Europeans and Wellsted published his early account of the journey in the Journal of the Royal Geographical Society. The following winter he returned but succumbed to fever and 'in a fit of delirium he discharged both barrels of his gun into his mouth, but the balls passing upwards only inflicted two ghastly wounds in the upper jaw'. He was taken to Bombay and from there returned to London on leave. He retired from the service in 1839, living part of the time on his navy pension in Blacklands House, a mental health facility of gentlemen. He died in 1842 at his family's home, 12/13 Molyneux Street, Marylebone.

Wellsted's papers were read at the Royal Geographical Society and he was immediately recognised by the scientific world. He was elected a fellow of the Royal Society on 6 April 1837 and was also a fellow of the Astronomical Society. In particular his unbiased accounts of geography and culture in Oman, continue as a unique description of the area at that early date. English Heritage are currently considering the erection of a blue memorial plaque at his family home in Molyneux Street.

== Family ==
Wellsted's niece was Kate Marsden who was a nurse who became an explorer travelling thousand's of miles across Russia to Siberia.

== Publications ==
- Travels in Arabia, 2 vols. (London 1838)
- Travels to the City of the Caliphs along the shores of the Persian Gulf and the Mediterranean (published 1840)

== Books about James Raymond Wellsted ==
- Fiction: Secret of the Sands by Sara Sheridan, published by HarperCollins, 2011
