= SGAA =

The acronym SGAA could refer to:

- the Sudan Government Administration Area, another name for the Halaib triangle, on the border of Egypt and Sudan
- the Sandy Gall Afghanistan Appeal
