= Hutaym =

Historical exonym and social label in the Arabian Peninsula

The term Hutaym (also Hutaim, Huteim) is a historical derogatory exonym and social caste label used in the Arabian Peninsula to describe various independent nomadic groups. Rather than denoting a specific genealogical tribe, it was applied by dominant rival tribes to marginalize groups they considered to be of lower social status. The name has been used as a catch-all term covering various marginalized groups, such as the ʿAwāzim of eastern Arabia and the Jibāliyya of the Sinai. The primary demographic group historically subjected to this label is the Rashāyida (Bani Rasheed), a recognized Arab tribe who trace their lineage to the Banu Abs.

Hutaym (plural Hitmān) is sometimes incorrectly spelled Ḥutaym or al-Hutaym. The standard pronunciation in Peninsular Arabic is ihtēm. It comes from the adjective ahtam and means "a man whose two front teeth are broken off at the root", that is, one who cannot trace his ancestry. Because of this derogatory connotation, its use is considered a severe tribal slur in modern Saudi Arabia. The main tribal sections historically mislabeled under this term include the Āl Barrāk, Āl Qalādān, Āl Shumaylān, Maẓābira, Nawāmisa and Fuhayqāt, which are branches of the Rashāyida. The head of Āl Barrāk is traditionally chief of these groups.

There is little reliable information on a unified origin for the groups labelled Hutaym, which is consistent with the name being a derogatory term applied by outsiders to socially low-ranking groups. Historically, dominant Arab tribes regarded them as neither Qaḥṭānite nor ʿAdnānite and thus not true Arabs by descent, refusing to intermarry with them. Hostile folklore propagated by rival tribes, often documented by early Western ethnographers, attempted to justify this social exclusion by accusing a mythical eponymous ancestor of severe moral taboos. Another account makes them descendants of the Banū Hilāl. James Raymond Wellsted, who visited the region in the early 1830s, speculated that they were the Ichthyophagi mentioned by classical authors.

The groups labelled Hutaym regarded themselves as kin of another historically marginalized group, the Sharārāt. Both groups traditionally bred dromedaries (camels), sheep, and goats, which afforded them a higher socioeconomic standing among dominant tribes compared to other marginalized groups. They were also regarded as highly skilled hunters. Those living on the coast worked as fishers.

Demographics associated with this label live mainly around Khaybar, and the Ḥarrat Khaybar lava field has historically also been called the Ḥarrat Hutaym. They also reside in the Nafūd and the oasis al-Mustajidda and have migrated into the Tihāma to the south. Groups labelled as Hutaymī are also found in Egypt, Sudan and the islands of the Red Sea, although it is not clear whether these groups are actually related to the peninsular groups. The camel traders of Kassala associated with this name have intermarried with the Beja.

The term Hutaym first appears in Arabic literature around 1200, then again in Ottoman tax records of the early 16th century. They were recorded as one of the five tribes of the sanjak of Gaza who paid tribute to the sultan. A record of 1553 states they habitually raided the sanjak of Ajlun and had to be put down. By the 19th century, as recorded by several European travellers, the term was explicitly being used to describe a low caste and not a specific tribe. The English poet Charles Montagu Doughty travelled through territory associated with them in 1877–1878 and wrote about his experience in Travels in Arabia Deserta. He considered them more robust than the Bedouins but less dignified. The British Admiralty's Handbook of Arabia, written for the Arab Revolt during World War I in 1916, denigrated them as soldiers but admitted that they openly resisted the Rashīdī Emirate (Britain's adversary) and even raided the outskirts of the Rashīdī capital, Ḥāʾil.
