= London Calling (Sheridan novel) =

2013 novel by Sara Sheridan

- Author: Sara Sheridan
- Language: English
- Genre: Crime Fiction
- Published: 2013
- Publisher: Polygon Books
- Publication place: Scotland
- Media type: Paperback, Hardback, e-book
- Pages: 256
- ISBN: 978-1846972430
- Preceded by: Brighton Belle

London Calling is a novel written by Scottish writer Sara Sheridan. The book was first published by Polygon Books in 2013 and is the second in the series of the Mirabelle Bevan mysteries. It is set in 1952 London and centers on the jazz scene of the time. The novel follows Brighton Belle in the series.

== Plot summary ==
Set in the post-war atmosphere of 1952, London Calling follows ex-Secret Service agent Mirabelle Bevan as she investigates the mystery of a missing debutante, wealthy eighteen-year-old Rose Bellamy Gore. Mirabelle is assisted once again by the upbeat Vesta Churchill as they explore an underworld of smoky nightclubs, jazz bars, and intriguing characters to gather information and seek answers. Detective Superintendent Alan McGregor keeps an eye on Mirabelle's activities as a fledgling romance blooms between the two.

== Setting ==
London Calling explores the jazz scene of 1952 London, a period of great social change amidst post-war austerity.

== Characters ==
Recurring characters from the series (Mirabelle Bevan, Vesta Churchill and Superintendent Alan McGregor) are joined by Vesta's childhood friend and jazz musician Lindon Claremont, her new beau Charlie Baker, and a host of wealthy young society figures.
