= Halaib =

Town in land claimed by Egypt and Sudan along the Red Sea

Halaib حلايب
- Town
- Location in the Halaib Triangle Halaib (Sudan)
- Coordinates: 22°13′23″N 36°38′51″E
- Country: De jure Disputed area between: Egypt; Sudan De facto Administered by: Egypt
- Governorate: Red Sea Governorate (Egypt)
- State: Red Sea State (Sudan)
- Time zone: UTC+2 (EET)
  - Summer (DST): UTC+3 (EEST)

Halaib (Arabic: حلايب, romanized: Ḥalāyib [ħæˈlæːjeb]) is a Red Sea port and town located in the Halaib Triangle, a disputed area between Egypt and Sudan.

It is about 20 km (12 mi) southeast of the ruins of the medieval port ʽAydhab.

== Name ==
Alternative spellings for the name include Halayeb, Hala'ib, and Halayib. The name of Halayeb comes from "ooleyeb", a word in the Beja language which translates to a type of mangrove tree that grows on the coast. Halayeb's name is originally Mersa Ooleyeb, meaning Ooleyeb Harbour.

== Geography ==
In the Halaib region, Afrotropical elements reach their northernmost limits at Gabal Elba, making it a unique region among the regions dominating North African ecosystems. There is also dense cover of acacias, mangroves and other shrubs, in addition to endemic species of plants such as Biscutella elbensis.

The highest peaks in the area are Mount Elba (1,435 m or 4,708 ft), Mount Shellal (1,409 m or 4,623 ft), Mount Shendib (1,911 m or 6,270 ft) and Mount Shendodai (1,526 m or 5,007 ft).

=== Climate ===
Climate data for Halaib (1961–1990)
Month	Jan	Feb	Mar	Apr	May	Jun	Jul	Aug	Sep	Oct	Nov	Dec	Year
Record high °C (°F)	31.4 (88.5)	40.7 (105.3)	39.7 (103.5)	42.8 (109.0)	46.6 (115.9)	45.4 (113.7)	44.5 (112.1)	44.5 (112.1)	45.0 (113.0)	40.0 (104.0)	35.4 (95.7)	34.0 (93.2)	46.6 (115.9)
Mean daily maximum °C (°F)	24.9 (76.8)	25.7 (78.3)	27.5 (81.5)	30.6 (87.1)	31.1 (88.0)	35.7 (96.3)	37.0 (98.6)	37.1 (98.8)	33.7 (92.7)	32.4 (90.3)	27.7 (81.9)	24.9 (76.8)	30.7 (87.3)
Daily mean °C (°F)	20.9 (69.6)	21.1 (70.0)	22.7 (72.9)	25.5 (77.9)	27.3 (81.1)	30.5 (86.9)	31.5 (88.7)	31.9 (89.4)	29.4 (84.9)	28.1 (82.6)	24.1 (75.4)	21.3 (70.3)	26.2 (79.2)
Mean daily minimum °C (°F)	16.8 (62.2)	16.5 (61.7)	18.0 (64.4)	20.5 (68.9)	23.4 (74.1)	25.3 (77.5)	26.1 (79.0)	26.7 (80.1)	25.1 (77.2)	23.8 (74.8)	20.5 (68.9)	17.6 (63.7)	21.7 (71.1)
Record low °C (°F)	11.0 (51.8)	10.3 (50.5)	12.0 (53.6)	13.5 (56.3)	16.2 (61.2)	18.0 (64.4)	16.5 (61.7)	19.7 (67.5)	20.5 (68.9)	18.8 (65.8)	15.5 (59.9)	12.0 (53.6)	10.3 (50.5)
Average precipitation mm (inches)	0.6 (0.02)	0.0 (0.0)	0.0 (0.0)	0.5 (0.02)	1.2 (0.05)	0.0 (0.0)	0.2 (0.01)	0.0 (0.0)	0.0 (0.0)	3.2 (0.13)	17.9 (0.70)	4.2 (0.17)	27.8 (1.09)
Average precipitation days (≥ 0.1 mm)	0.1	0.0	0.0	0.1	0.1	0.0	0.1	0.0	0.0	0.2	1.4	0.7	2.7
Average relative humidity (%)	72	69	69	69	63	56	56	61	63	75	76	72	66.8
Source: NOAA

== See also ==
- Halaib Triangle
- Shalateen
