= Sara Sheridan =

Scottish activist and writer

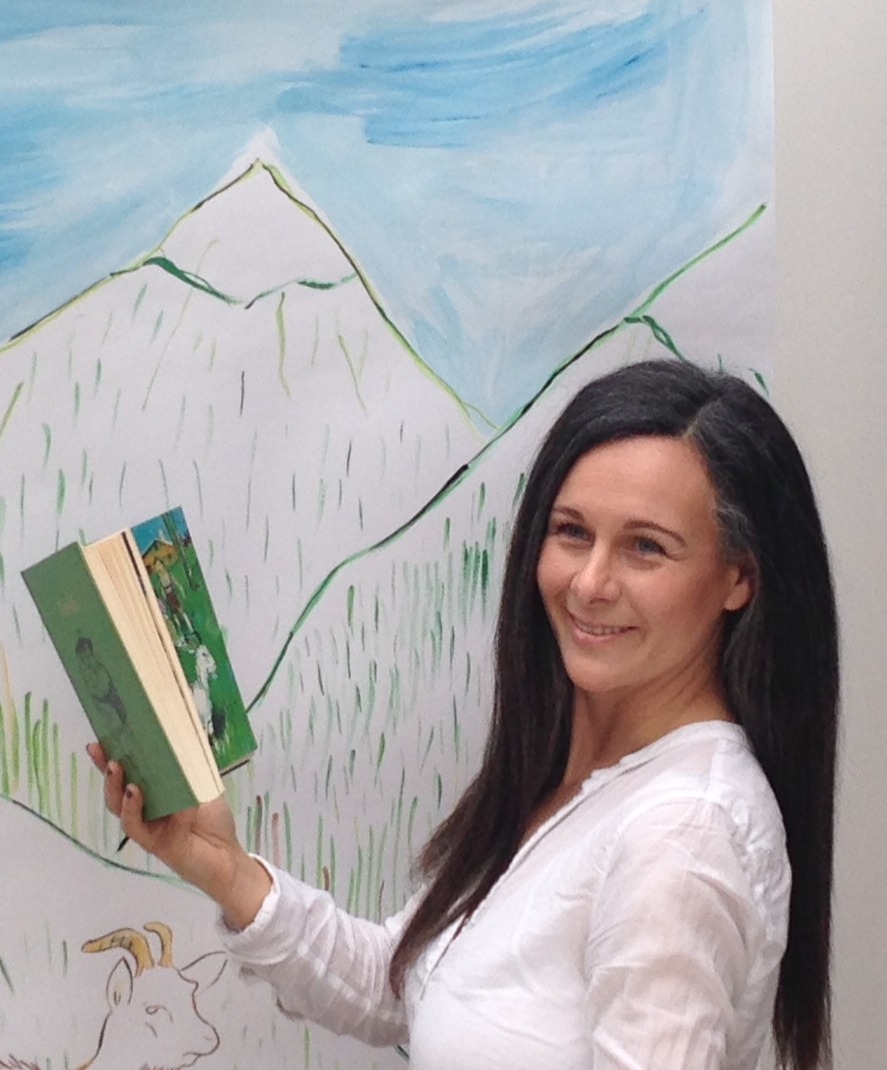
- Born: 7 June 1968 (age 58); Edinburgh, Scotland
- Occupation: Writer
- Writing career
- Genres: Novels, historical, crime
- Notable work: Brighton Belle
- Website: www.sarasheridan.com

Sara Sheridan (born 7 June 1968) is a Scottish activist and writer who works in a variety of genres, though predominantly in historical fiction. She is the creator of the Mirabelle Bevan mysteries.

== Personal life ==
Born Sara Louise Goodwin, Sheridan comes from Edinburgh and was educated at Trinity College, Dublin. In 2014 she actively campaigned in favour of Scottish independence and in 2016 supported the Remain campaign in the UK's EU Referendum. Sheridan has one daughter, Molly by her first marriage to Irish businessman, Seamus Sheridan. She married her second husband, Alan Ferrier in 2011 and the couple live in Scotland.

== Work ==
Sheridan's first book, contemporary commercial fiction, Truth or Dare entered the Sunday Times top 50 when it was published in 1998. It was nominated for the Saltire Prize and was also listed in the Scottish Libraries Top 100 Books. In the successive two years Sheridan wrote two more novels in the same genre, Ma Polinski's Pockets and The Pleasure Express. During this period, she also co-wrote two short films, Fish Supper starring Lynda Bellingham and The Window Bed, which was nominated for a Sky Movies Max Award in 2001. She was then commissioned by specialist publisher Barrington Stoke to write a novella for reluctant readers, called The Blessed and The Damned.

She now writes historical novels set in two distinct eras: one based around the real lives of notable figures in the late Georgian/early Victorian eras (The Secret Mandarin (2009), Secret of the Sands (2011), On Starlit Seas (2016), The Ice Maiden (2018), The Fair Botanists (2022), The Secrets of Blythswood Square (2024) and a 9-part series of 1950s crime noir mysteries featuring her fictional ex-secret service heroine, Mirabelle Bevan (Brighton Belle (2012), London Calling (2014), British Bulldog (2015), Operation Goodwood (2016), Russian Roulette (2017), England Expects (2018), Indian Summer (2019), Highland Fling (2020) and Celtic Cross (2021)). The Mirabelle Bevan Mysteries were optioned by STV in 2015 but were not developed for television. In 2022 the series was longlisted for the Crime Writers Association Dagger in the Library Award. In 2017 On Starlit Seas was shortlisted for the Wilbur Smith Adventure Writing Prize. In 2022 her novel The Fair Botanists won Waterstones Scottish Book of the Year. In 2024 her novel The Secrets of Blythswood Square was longlisted for the Saltire Society's Prize for Fiction Book of the Year. Sheridan has also written two children's picture books, (I'm Me (2010) which was inspired by her relationship with her niece and a pan-European picture book written with her daughter, Molly, Monsters Unite (2019).

Sheridan occasionally appears as a commenter on TV and radio in the UK. She has reported from both Tallinn, Estonia and Sharjah, United Arab Emirates for BBC Radio 4. She has contributed to several British newspapers, including writing blog articles for The Guardian in 2011, 2012, 2013 and 2014. She also appeared, talking about history and feminism on RTE radio in 2017 and 2018. In 2017 she wrote a Love Letter to Europe which was published on the cover of The National newspaper. In 2013 she spoke about The History of the Lady on BBC Radio 4's Woman's Hour. Sheridan also writes blog articles for the Huffington Post and occasionally writes for the BBC online and as a cultural commentator on BBC Radio Scotland. Two of her five-part radio plays have been broadcast on BBC Radio Four.

Sheridan also writes TV tie-in books. Her first, for the second series of ITV's hit drama series, Victoria was based on the early married life of Queen Victoria (2017) and the second for ITV's adaptation of Jane Austen's last, unfinished novel, Sanditon (2019).

She remapped Scotland for Historic Environment Scotland (Where are the Women? An imagined female atlas of Scotland - 2019) The book was included in the David Hume Institute's First Minister's Summer Reading List 2019. The book is credited with inspiring Claire Mitchell QC to found the Accused Witches of Scotland campaign in 2019 to seek an apology and a pardon for Scotland's witches and raise a national memorial.. In collaboration with Glasgow City Heritage Trust, Sheridan added many women from her book to artist Will Knight's Map of Glasgow. Sheridan similarly remapped London (London's Lost Women: 100 monuments we ought to have, 2028)

A portrait of her by Scottish artist Sophie Mckay Knight, the result of a creative collaboration, was featured by The Guardian Art & Design column in 2015 before going on public exhibition in the National Gallery of Scotland.

She is a former member of the Society of Authors Committee for Scotland and the Crime Writers Association. From 2009 to 2015 Sheridan sat on the board of writers' collective, '26'. She both managed and took part in the 26 Treasures projects which took place at the V&A, Kensington, the Museum of Childhood, Bethnal Green, The National Museum of Scotland, Edinburgh and the Museum of Childhood, Edinburgh. The resulting book, 26 Treasures won the Literature Category at the British Design Awards 2013. Sheridan also ran the organisation's annual charity advent calendar, 26 Stories for Christmas. Sheridan is credited with mentoring several young, Scottish, female writers early in their careers.

In 2016 Sheridan co-founded REEK with her daughter, fashion producer, Molly Sheridan. REEK was a fragrance company that spoke out against the lack of female memorialisation throughout history and challenged beauty industry norms. REEK's fragrances memorialised 'heroic, unapologetic and passionate women from history to the present day' and its first scent was launched in 2016 in memory of the Jacobite women. It has been called the 'first feminist fragrance'. In 2017 the company launched an eau de parfum in celebration of the memory of witches. The company closed in 2020 and its artefacts were collected by the National Museum of Scotland and Glasgow Women's Library.

== Bibliography ==
Mirabelle Bevan Mysteries

- Brighton Belle (2012)
- London Calling (2013)
- England Expects (2014)
- British Bulldog (2015)
- Operation Goodwood (2016)
- Russian Roulette (2017)
- Indian Summer (2019)
- Highland Fling (2020)
- Celtic Cross (2021)

Other novels

- Truth or Dare (1998)
- Ma Polinski’s Pockets (1999)
- The Pleasure Express (2001)
- The Blessed and the Damned (2002)
- The Secret Mandarin (2009)
- Secret of the Sands (2010)
- On Starlit Seas (2016) reissued new edition (2025)
- The Ice Maiden (2018)
- The Fair Botanists (2021)
- The Secrets of Blythswood Square (2024)
- The Jewel Keepers (2026)
- The Counterfeit Affair (2027)

Children's picture books

- I'm Me (2010)
- Monsters Unite (2019)

Non-fiction books

- Victoria and Albert: A Royal Love Affair (2017)
- Where are the Women? (2019)
- The World of Sanditon (2019)
- London's Lost Women (2028)

Short story collections and essays

- Girls About Town (1999)
- Sexy Shorts for Summer (2000)
- Bloody Scotland (2017)
- Imagine a Country (2019)
- Noir at the Bar Anthology (2020)
- Edinburgh Literary Salon (2021)
- One City Trust Anthology (2021)
- All the Way Home (2022)
- Hot Blood, Cold Blood (2023)
- Women Who Dared (2025)
- Feminist Nation (2026)
- Scotland's Waterfalls (Oscar Van Heek)

Radio Drama

- On Portobello Prom (BBC Radio Four 2023)
- Robert Burns: His Psychotherapy and Cure (BBC Radio Four 2024)
- I Love You, Mr DeMille (BBC Radio Four 2026)
