= Brighton Belle (Sheridan novel) =

2012 novel

- Author: Sara Sheridan
- Language: English
- Genre: Crime Fiction
- Published: 2012
- Publisher: Polygon Books
- Publication place: Scotland
- Media type: Paperback, Hardback, e-book
- Pages: 256
- ISBN: 978-1846972331
- Followed by: London Calling (2013 novel)

Brighton Belle is a novel written by Scottish writer Sara Sheridan. The book was first published by Polygon Books in 2012 and is the first in the series of the Mirabelle Bevan mysteries.

This novel is followed in the series by London Calling (2013) and England Expects (2014).

== Plot summary ==
Set in post-war 1951 Brighton, the plot follows bereaved ex-Secret Service agent Mirabelle Bevan whose work at a debt collection agency leads her to investigate a disappearance mystery with the help of insurance clerk Vesta Churchill. Along the way they discover murder, Nazi war criminals, betting scams, and counterfeit coins. Brighton Belle has been described as 'a cosy crime noir mystery'.

== Main characters ==
=== Mirabelle Bevan ===
Mirabelle Bevan is the lead character in Brighton Belle and in the Mirabelle Bevan mystery series. Having retired to the seaside after a bereavement, ex-Secret Service agent Mirabelle's skills are often employed in the mysteries she encounters. Described as "well put-together, and in her prime", Mirabelle is reserved, intelligent and inquisitive and has been described as, "One part Nancy Drew, two parts Jessica Fletcher, Mirabelle has a dogged tenacity to rival Poirot."

=== Vesta Churchill ===
Vesta Churchill is an enthusiastic, bright and bubbly insurance clerk who assists Mirabelle Bevan in her investigations. Vesta provides an insight into living with black skin and the racial tensions of early 1950s Britain.

=== Detective Superintendent Alan McGregor ===
Detective Superintendent Alan McGregor handles Mirabelle's case once it is handed over to the police. Often grumpy in manner and harbouring sexist views, McGregor is at first dismissive of Mirabelle, but his respect for her grows over time as a fledgling romance develops.

== Setting ==
Brighton Belle is set in 1951 Brighton and makes reference to local landmarks, with some chapters taking place in London. The post-war atmosphere is one of austerity, and the book does not shy away from the racial and gender equality topics of the era. Many characters are influenced by their experiences during World War II.
