= Alliance of Revolutionary Forces of West Sudan =

The Alliance of Revolutionary Forces of West Sudan was formed on January 20, 2006, when the Justice and Equality Movement and the Sudan Liberation Movement merged to form a single rebel alliance in the Sudanese region of Darfur.

ARFWS issued a press statement in French and Arabic in the Chadian capital of N'Djamena stating that "The two movements have agreed to join and coordinate all political, military and social forces, their international relations and to double their combat capacity in a collective body under the name, the Alliance of Revolutionary Forces of West Sudan. This union will strengthen the solidarity, cohesion and unity of the people of Sudan in general and that of the west in particular. It will further strengthen the position of the armed movements in [peace] negotiations" currently under way in Abuja in Nigeria."

JEM president and doctor Ibrahim Khalil told reporters, "We have set up this union in the interests of the people of Darfur. To lose time without uniting our efforts means extending the days of the (Khartoum) regime which has become a factor in the disintegration of the regime."

The press statement was also signed by SLM leader Minni Arcua Minnawi.

ARFWS and the Government of Chad were united in opposition to Sudan heading the African Union at the summit on 23 January 2006.

== See also ==
Sudanese rebel groups

- Sudan Liberation Movement
- Justice and Equality Movement
- National Movement for Reform and Development
- Eastern Front (Sudan)
- Sudan People's Liberation Movement (northern sector)
