= Eastern Front (Sudan) =

Coalition of rebel groups operating in eastern Sudan

- Flag of the Eastern Front
- Leader: Musa Mohamed Ahmed (Chairman)
- Groups: SPLA; Beja Congress; Rashaida Free Lions; JEM; FAES
- Active regions: Eastern Sudan: Red Sea; Kassala
- Wars: Second Sudanese Civil War

The Eastern Front (Arabic: الجبهة الشرقية, romanized: al-Jabhah al-Sharqīyah) was a coalition of rebel groups operating in eastern Sudan along the border with Eritrea, particularly the states of Red Sea and Kassala. The Eastern Front's Chairman is Musa Mohamed Ahmed. While the Sudan People's Liberation Army (SPLA) was the primary member of the Eastern Front, the SPLA was obliged to leave by the January 2005 Comprehensive Peace Agreement that ended the Second Sudanese Civil War. Their place was taken in February 2004 after the merger of the larger Beja Congress with the smaller Rashaida Free Lions, two tribal based groups of the Beja and Rashaida people, respectively. The Justice and Equality Movement (JEM), a rebel group from Darfur in the west, then joined.

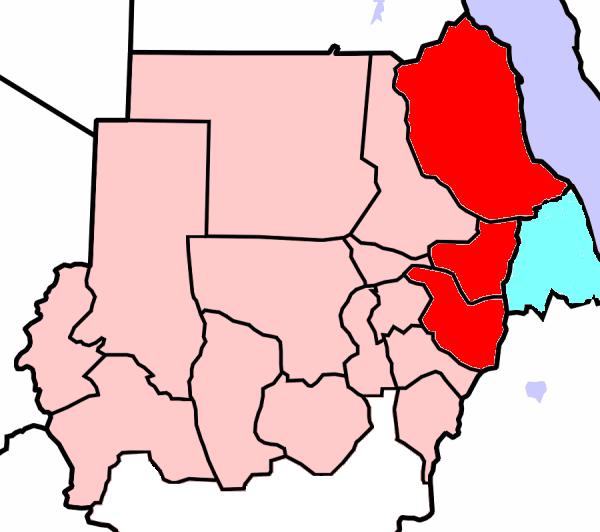
Kassala, Al Qadarif, and the Red Sea states (in red), all of which border Eritrea (in light blue). The Red Sea is marked in blue

== Demands ==
Both the Free Lions and the Beja Congress stated that government inequity in the distribution of oil profits was the cause of their rebellion. They demanded to have a greater say in the composition of the national government, which has been seen as a destabilizing influence on the agreement ending the conflict in Southern Sudan. The Eastern Front was strengthened after 17 Beja rioters were killed by police in Port Sudan in late January 2005 and angry young Beja men began to join rebel camps in Eritrea. The Eritrean government in Asmara supported the Eastern Front apparently in retaliation for Sudanese support to the Eritrean Islamist factions. Meanwhile, the JEM has formed an alliance with the Eastern Front and moved troops into the region apparently in an attempt to position itself as a national movement, rather than one limited to its Darfur homeland. The Eastern Front also demand the liberation of Hala'ib Triangle from Egyptian occupation and its restitution to Sudanese sovereignty, as was the case prior to the 1990s.

== Sudanese government response ==
The Eastern Front had threatened to block the flow of crude oil, which travels from the oil fields of the south-central regions to outside markets through Port Sudan. A government plan to build a second oil refinery near Port Sudan was also threatened. The government was reported to have three times as many soldiers in the east to suppress the rebellion and protect vital infrastructure as in the more widely reported Darfur region. There were also rumors that the government is considering unleashing militias, similar to the Janjaweed of the Darfur conflict, against the Rashaida and Beja.

== Peace talks and agreement ==
The Eritrean government in mid-2006 dramatically changed their position on the conflict. From being the main supporter of the Eastern Front they decided that bringing the Sudanese government around the negotiating table for a possible agreement with the rebels would be in their best interests. The International Crisis Group suggests this is because they want to avoid any conflict on their Sudanese border in case of war with Ethiopia. They were successful in their attempts and on 19 June 2006, the two sides signed an agreement on declaration of principles. This was the start of four months of Eritrean-mediated negotiations for a comprehensive peace agreement between the Sudanese government and the Eastern Front, which culminated in signing of the Eastern Sudan Peace Agreement on 14 October 2006, in Asmara.

The agreement covers security issues, power sharing at a federal and regional level, and wealth sharing in regard to the three Eastern states Kassala, Red Sea and Al Qadarif. It also established an Eastern Sudan States Coordinating Council to enhance coordination and cooperation between the three states.

On 8 January 2011 the Federal Alliance of Eastern Sudan (FAES), a splinter group of the former rebel Eastern Front, merged with the Justice and Equality Movement (JEM).

== See also ==
- Alliance of Revolutionary Forces of West Sudan
- Sudan People's Liberation Movement (northern sector)
