= Mabrouk Mubarak Salim =

Sudanese politician

Mabrouk Mubarak Salim is a Sudanese politician and was the Minister in the Ministry of Transport and Roads, appointed to in May 2007. He was also the founding member of the Sudanese Free Lions, an armed group composed of Rashaida. He is also the leader of the Rashaida tribe in Sudan.
