= Halaib Triangle =

Disputed territory between Egypt and Sudan

Halaib Triangle مُثَلَّث حَلَايِب
- Disputed territory
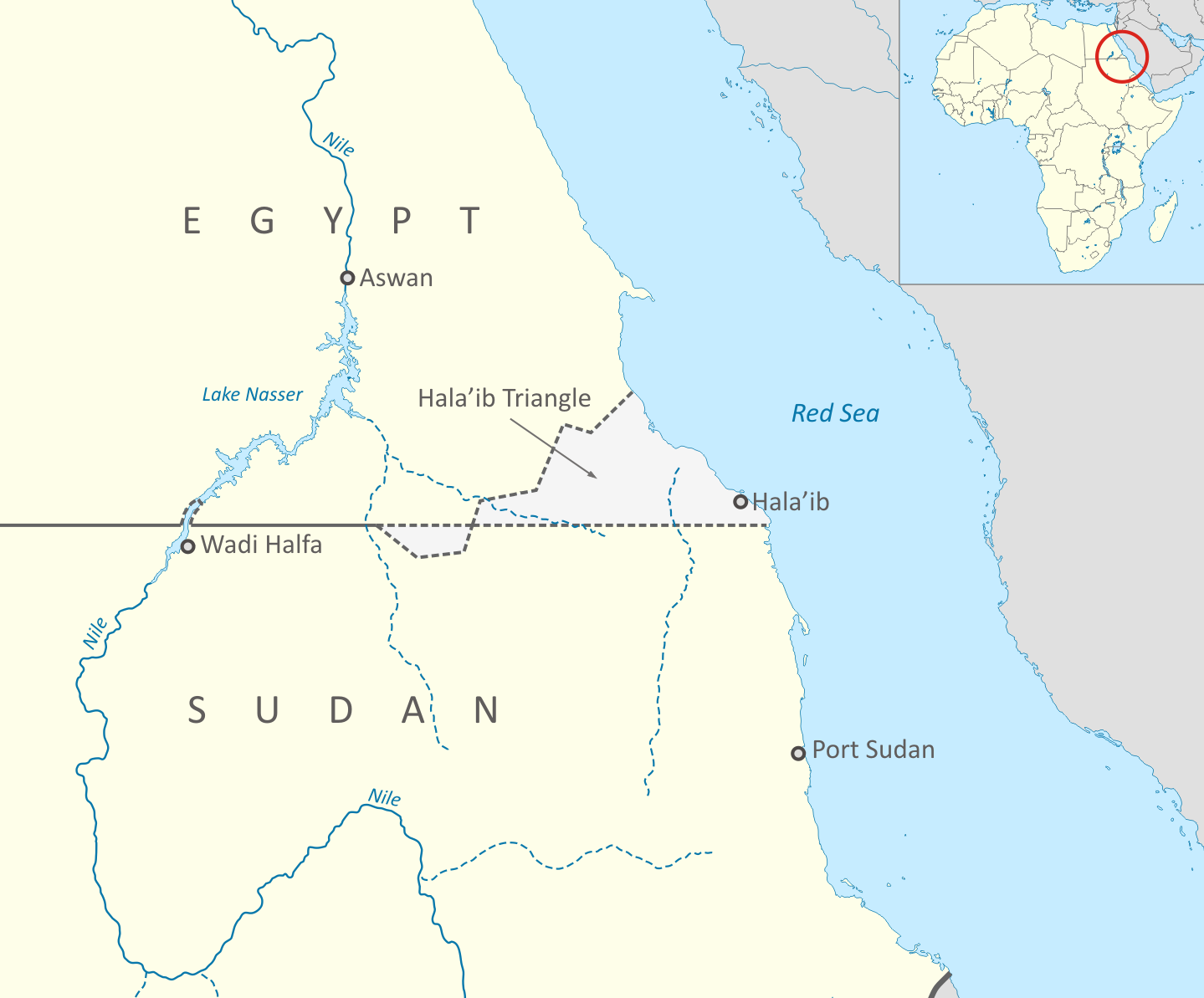
- Location of the Halaib Triangle
- Coordinates: 22°28′09″N 35°31′23″E
- Country: De jure Disputed area between: Egypt; Sudan De facto Administered by: Egypt
- Governorate: Red Sea Governorate (Egypt)
- State: Red Sea Governate (Egypt)

Area
  - Total: 20,580 km^{2} (7,950 sq mi)
  - Disputed area: 20,580 km^{2} (7,950 sq mi)
- Lowest elevation: 0 m (0 ft)

Population
  - Total: 27,000

The Halaib Triangle measures 20,580 square kilometres (7,950 mi^{2}), stretching inland from its Northeast African coast of the Red Sea. The area, which takes its name from the town of Halaib, is created by the difference in the Egypt–Sudan border between the "political boundary" set in 1899 by the Anglo-Egyptian Condominium, which runs along the 22nd parallel north, and the "administrative boundary" set by the British in 1902, which gave administrative responsibility for this piece of land north of the line to Sudan, which was an Anglo-Egyptian client at the time. With the independence of Sudan in 1956, both Egypt and Sudan claimed sovereignty over it. Sudan considers the area part of its Red Sea State, and included it in local elections until the late 1980s. In 1994, the Egyptian military moved to take control of the land as a part of Red Sea Governorate, and Egypt has been actively investing in it since then. Egypt has recently been categorical in rejecting international arbitration or even political negotiations regarding the area.

The description of this area as a "triangle" is a rough approximation. The southern boundary is at exactly latitude 22° north, the northeastern consists of the Red Sea coast, and the northwestern is jagged. A large parcel of land south of latitude 22°, referred to as Bir Tawil, touches the triangle's westernmost point along the latitude line – neither Sudan nor Egypt claims Bir Tawil, as to do so accedes to a map which means the triangle will not belong to its claimant.

In 2021, the population of the triangle stood at about 27,000 residents.

== Name ==
Spelled in Arabic: مُثَلَّث حَلَايِب Muthallath Ḥalāyib, lit. "Halaib Triangle"; pronounced in Sudanese Arabic [muˈsallas ħaˈlaːjib], and in Egyptian Arabic [moˈsællæs ħæˈlæːjeb].

== History ==
1692 Map showing the border between the Ottoman possessions of Egypt and Habesh

=== Colonial origins ===
Even back in Ottoman times, this mountainous region was the southern border of the Ottoman possession of Egypt. The Istanbul government did not focus on delineating the exact border to the Habesh Eyalet. This lasted until 1866 when all of the Sudanese coast became part of Egypt in an administrative reformation. While the Mahdi State never reached Halaib, the conflict brought British Forces to control autonomous Egypt and the region to the South.

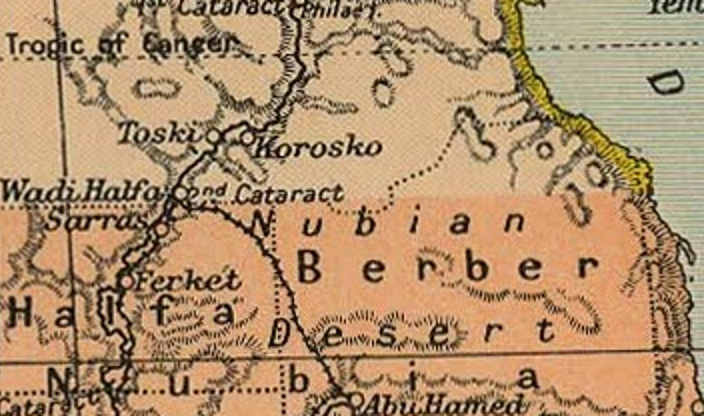
Map of the Halaib Triangle and Bir Tawil from 1912

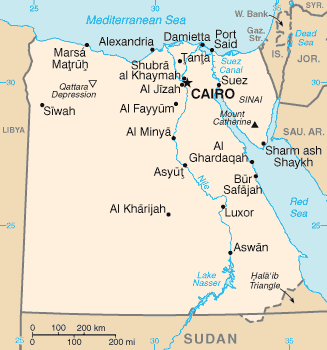
The Halaib Triangle has been under Egyptian administration since mid-1990. This map is colored from the Sudanese perspective

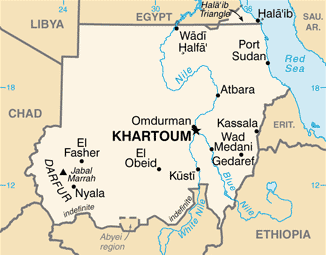
Although this map of Sudan depicts the Halaib Triangle as part of the country, Sudan does not exercise its jurisdiction over the area

Simplified map showing Egypt's claim (yellow and green), Sudan's claim (blue and green), the Halaib Triangle (light green), Wadi Halfa Salient (dark green) and Bir Tawil (white)

On 19 January 1899, an agreement between the UK and Egypt relating to the administration of the Sudan defined "Soudan" as the "territories south of the 22nd parallel of latitude". It contained a provision that would give Egypt control of the Red Sea port of Suakin, but an amendment on 10 July 1899 gave Suakin to Sudan instead. On 4 November 1902, the UK drew a separate "administrative boundary", intended to reflect the actual use of the land by the tribes in the region.

The 1902 border assigned administration of the territory of the Ababda tribe of the Beja people south of the 22-degree latitude line to Egypt, and gave to Sudan the grazing land of another Beja subtribe, The Bishareen north of the line to administer. The Sudan-administered territory comprised about 18,000 km^{2} (7000 sq. mi.), including the towns of Halaib and Abu Ramad. When Sudan became independent in 1956, Egypt regarded the latitude 22° territorial boundary of 1899 as the border between the two countries, while Sudan held to the 1902 administrative boundary. As a result, both Egypt and Sudan claim sovereignty over the territory. Conversely, the area south of the line which had been administered by Egypt, Bir Tawil, is a terra nullius, claimed by neither country.

=== 20th century ===
In February 1958, two years after Sudanese independence, with Sudan planning to hold elections in the Triangle, President Gamal Abdel Nasser of Egypt sent troops into the disputed region for the referendum of the proposed unification between Egypt and Syria in the United Arab Republic, but withdrew them the same month. Halaib was considered part of Sudan's Red Sea State and participated in all Sudanese elections until the last Sudanese election in the late 1980s.

Although both countries continued to lay claim to the land, joint control of the area remained in effect until 1992, when Egypt objected to Sudan's granting of exploration rights for the waters off the Triangle to a Canadian oil company. Negotiations began, but the company pulled out of the deal until sovereignty was settled. In July 1994, Sudan sent memoranda to the United Nations Security Council, the Organisation of African Unity (OAU) and the Arab League complaining about what it claimed was more than 39 military and administrative incursions by Egypt into Sudanese territory since Sudan had last filed memoranda in May 1993. In January 1995, Egypt rejected a Sudanese request for the OAU Foreign Ministers' Council to review the dispute at their meeting in Addis Ababa. Then, after an unsuccessful assassination attempt on Egyptian President Hosni Mubarak when he arrived in Addis Ababa to attend the meeting, Egypt accused Sudan of complicity, and, among other responses, strengthened its control of the Halaib Triangle, expelling Sudanese police and other officials.

In 1998, relations between Egypt and Sudan somewhat improved, and the countries announced their intention to work together to resolve the Halaib Triangle dispute, with increased cooperation between their security forces. Later that year, though, Sudan accused Egypt of harassing Sudanese citizens in the area, a charge which Egypt denied. Nevertheless, by March 1999, the countries were in diplomatic discussions aimed at improving relations between them. During a visit to Egypt by Sudanese President Omar al-Bashir in December 1999, a joint communique was issued pledging to solve the Halaib dispute "in an integrational brotherly context..."

In January 2000, Sudan withdrew its forces from the area, effectively ceding control of the border zone to Egypt, whose forces have occupied and administered the area since.

=== 21st century ===
In 2004, Sudanese president Omar Al-Bashir claimed that despite his nation's withdrawal in 2000, and Egypt's de facto control of the Triangle, the area still rightfully belonged to Sudan, which had "never relinquished" it. "We did not make any concessions.... The proof is that we have recently renewed the complaint to the Security Council," he said, according to the Press. Al-Bashir reiterated the Sudanese claim of sovereignty over Halaib in a 2010 speech in Port Sudan, saying "Halayeb is Sudanese and will always be Sudanese."

The Eastern Front, a Sudanese politico-military coalition comprising the Beja Congress and Free Lions that signed a peace agreement with Khartoum, has stated that it considers Halaib to be part of Sudan due to its population being ethnically, linguistically and tribally connected to that country. The head of the Eastern Front and Beja Congress, Musa Muhammad Ahmad, has declared that the issue of Halaib's sovereignty should be decided by international arbitration in a similar manner to the issue of sovereignty over Abyei between Northern and Southern Sudan.

In October 2009, the Electoral Commission that prepared a comprehensive plan for Sudan's general elections in April 2010 declared that Halaib was one of the Red Sea State electoral districts and that its people should exercise their constitutional rights and register in order to participate in the general elections. Voter registration did not take place in the Halaib Triangle area because the team from the Sudanese election commission was refused entry by Egyptian authorities. In December 2009, the Sudanese presidential assistant Musa Mohamed Ahmed was barred from entering the border area. Ahmed's visit was intended to "assert [Sudanese] sovereignty over the Halaib Triangle and inspect the situation of the people and provide moral and financial support to the members of the Sudanese army unit trapped inside since the [Egyptian] occupation began." His remarks were the first official recognition that Sudanese Army personnel remained inside the area of de facto Egyptian control. Ahmed also asserted that the Halaib Triangle is Sudanese and would not be forsaken "under any circumstances."

The government of Egypt is taking steps to close the Egyptian-Sudanese trade center of Alshalateen and move it to the border control pass point on the 22nd parallel, which has had its facilities enlarged and its administrative manpower increased to handle the Egyptian-Sudanese land trade. By doing this, trucks bringing goods to Egypt from Sudan will not be allowed to unload their goods in Alshalateen, as in the past, but instead at the Hadarba border pass point. Wadi Halfa is another border pass point west of the Nile River at 22 degrees north.

In 2009, the Egyptian electricity authority was building a line to supply the city of Alshalateen with electric power from the main Egyptian grid to replace the generators being used there. This line will extend in the future to Abu Ramad and Halaib. Since May 2010 a new paved road has connected the triangle to Port Sudan.

It was reported in the Sudanese daily Al-Ahram Today on 22 April 2010 that Al-Taher Muhammad Hasaay, the former head of the Halaib Council and a member of the Bisharin tribe who was campaigning against the Egyptian military presence in the Halaib Triangle, died in a hospital in Cairo after having been detained by Egyptian security forces without trial for two years. A delegation of the Bisharin tribe stated to the Sudan Media Centre that seven of their members were also in detention: Muhammad Eissa Saeed, who had been in custody for six years, Ali Eissa Abu Eissa and Muhammad Saleem, detained for five years, and Hashim Othman, Muhammad Hussein AbdalHakam, Karrar Muhammad Tahir and Muhammad Tahir Muhammad Saleh each in holding for two years.

In July 2010, it was reported in the Egyptian newspaper Al-Masry Al-Youm that the chiefs of three tribes in the Halaib Triangle – Ababda, Bishareen and Rashaida – supported the Egyptian claims for the area, stating that they are Egyptian and not Sudanese citizens, and that they have all the rights of Egyptian citizens, including national identity cards, the right to vote in elections and to serve in the Egyptian military.

On November 29, 2010, an open letter was sent to the President of Sudan by Muhammad Al-Hassan Okair (Honda) who had been the parliamentary member of Halaib in 1995, from Halaib itself. The letter was written on behalf of the Bisharin, Hamad-Orab and Aliyaab tribes and complained of the forced inclusion of 20 villages that had been administered under indigenous civil society structures into two Egyptian electoral districts. The letter further complained of the siege of Halaib, the fact that its inhabitants live within barbed wire and that anything from Sudan is refused entry on the premise that Halaib is Egyptian and that the tribes' camels are not allowed to travel and graze for pasture in the ancestral lands of the Bisharin from Halaib to the neighbouring state of River Nile in Sudan.

The Egyptian government converted the village of Halayeb to a city, and various civilian projects are under construction. Mamdouh Ali Omara was elected by the local inhabitants as representative for the Halayeb area in the Egyptian parliamentary election of November 2015.

In 2016, an Egyptian Foreign Ministry spokesman said in a brief statement that these are Egyptian territories subject to Egyptian sovereignty, and that Egypt had no additional comment to make. International arbitration requires the consent of the concerned parties, whereas Egypt has been refusing arbitration to date.

A new asphalt-paved road has been built which begins south-west of Alshalateen and goes through the western portion of the triangle to the border pass of Suhin (Sohin), which is located at the 22nd parallel. In the future, this road will connect to the city of Abu Hamad in Sudan. Parts of the road can be seen on Google Earth and Bing maps.

== Settlements ==
The town of Halaib lies on the Red Sea coast. The major town in the area is Abu Ramad which lies 30 kilometres (19 mi) north west of Halaib on the coast. Abu Ramad is the last destination of the buses that connect the area to Cairo and the other cities of Egypt such as Aswan, Marsa Alam and Qena. The only other populated place is the small village of Hadarba, south east of Halaib town on the coast. Alshalateen is an Egyptian town just on the northern administrative boundary. The closest Sudanese town south of the disputed area is Osief (Marsa Osief), located 26 kilometres (16 mi) south of latitude 22, the political border line claimed by Egypt based on the 1899 agreement.

== Ecology and geography ==
In the Halaib region, Afrotropical elements have their northern limits at Gebel Elba, making it a unique region among Egypt's dominating Mediterranean and North African ecosystems. There is also dense cover of acacias, mangroves and other shrubs, in addition to endemic species of plants such as Biscutella elbensis.

The highest peaks in the area are Mount Elba (1,435 m (4,708 ft)), Mount Shellal (1,409 m (4,623 ft)), Mount Shendib (1,911 m (6,270 ft)) and Mount Shendodai (1,526 m (5,007 ft)). The mountainous area of Gebel Elba is a nature reserve declared by Egypt in a decree signed by the former prime minister Ahmed Nazif.

== Map ==
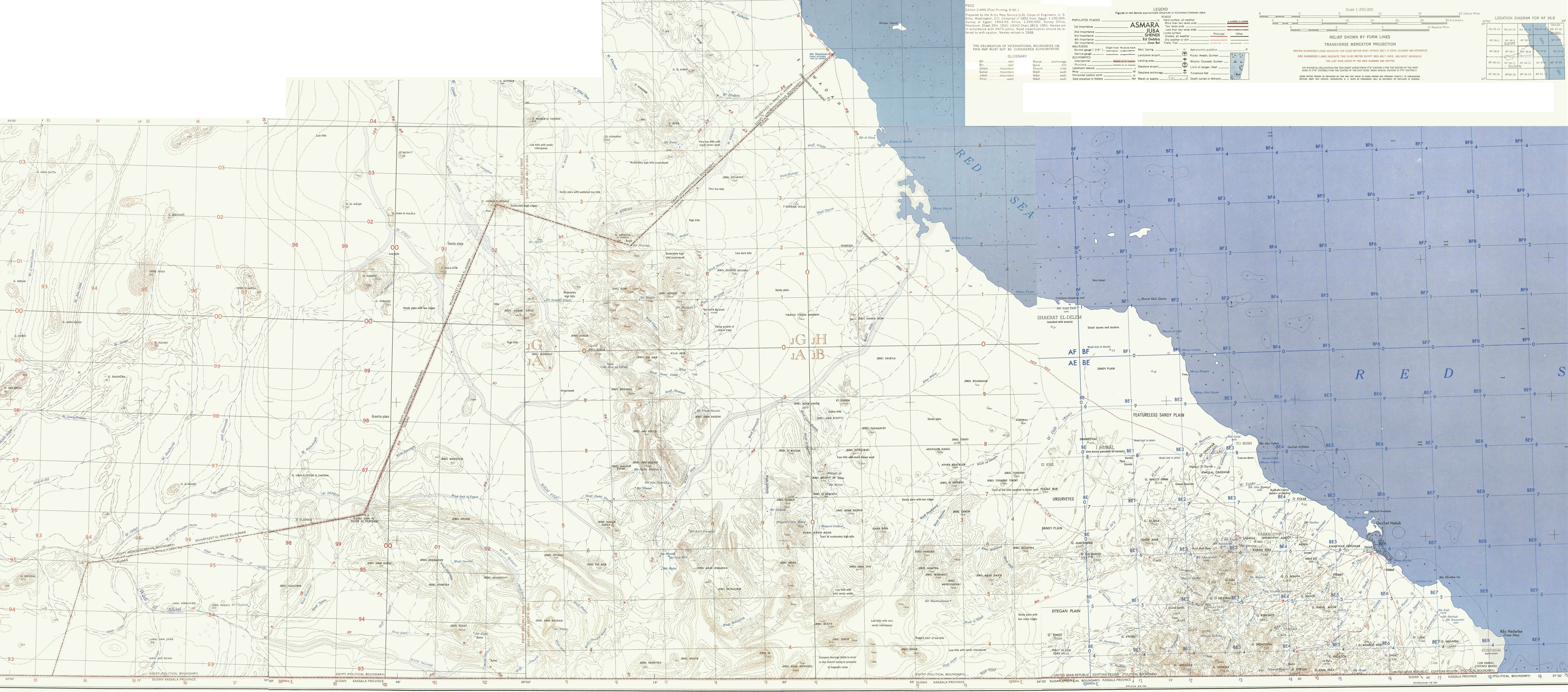
Area map pasted from four individual sheets

== See also ==
- Annexation
- Bir Tawil (Bartazoja Triangle), an adjoining terra nullius, claimed by neither Egypt nor Sudan
- Egypt–Sudan border
- Egypt–Sudan relations
- Foreign relations of Egypt
- Foreign relations of Sudan
- Territorial dispute
- Wadi Halfa Salient
