= Secret of the Sands =

2011 novel by Sara Sheridan

- Cover of novel Secret of the Sands
- Author: Sara Sheridan
- Language: English
- Genre: Historical Fiction
- Published: 2011
- Publisher: Harper Collins Publishers
- Publication place: Scotland
- Media type: Paperback, Hardback, e-book
- Pages: 438
- ISBN: 9781847561992

Secret of the Sands is a historical novel written by Scottish writer Sara Sheridan. The book was first published by HarperCollins in 2011. It is set in 1833 and has themes of colonialism and slavery.

== Plot summary ==
The novel is set in 1833, during a British naval survey of the coastline of the Arabian Peninsula. An ambitious Lieutenant James Wellstead's plans are thrown into disarray when two of his shipmates, Jones and Jessop, go missing in the desert while gathering intelligence and he has to carry out a daring rescue.

Slavery is still rife throughout Arabia. Zena, a headstrong Abyssinian beauty who was torn from her village, is now being offered for sale as a slave in the market of Muscat. However, her fortunes change when she finds herself in the company of the lieutenant. She must accompany him on his hazardous mission, forced to make big choices, and little knowing the fate that awaits them.

== Setting ==
Secret of the Sands is set in the historical world of 1833 on the Arabian Peninsula.
