= Sinkat, Sudan =

Sinkat سنكات
- Town
- Location in Sudan
- Coordinates: 18°49′55″N 36°49′49″E
- Country: Sudan
- State: Red Sea
- Elevation: 867 m (2,844 ft)
- Time zone: UTC+02:00 (CAT)

Sinkat (Arabic: سنكات, romanized: Sinkāt, Beja Ookwaakw) is a small town in eastern Sudan.

It is the main city of the district of the same name and, in some respects, the "capital" of the Hadendowa.

== Transport ==
It is served by a station on the mainline of the Sudan railway network.

== Climate ==
Sinkat has a hot arid climate (Köppen BWh) with sweltering summers and pleasantly warm winters.. Sinkat has some, though very sparse, erratic, and negligible rain in nearly every month of the year, although in July and August monsoon winds bring an average of 62 millimetres or 2.4 inches over two months. Sinkat lies some 900 metres or 3,000 feet above sea level and thus is on average 5 °C or 9 °F cooler than the nearby port town of Suakin.

Climate data for Sinkat
Month	Jan	Feb	Mar	Apr	May	Jun	Jul	Aug	Sep	Oct	Nov	Dec	Year
Mean daily maximum °C (°F)	23.7 (74.7)	24.6 (76.3)	27.8 (82.0)	31.3 (88.3)	35.6 (96.1)	37.9 (100.2)	36.3 (97.3)	35.8 (96.4)	36.5 (97.7)	31.9 (89.4)	25.8 (78.4)	24.9 (76.8)	31 (88)
Mean daily minimum °C (°F)	13.7 (56.7)	13.2 (55.8)	14.2 (57.6)	17.1 (62.8)	20.1 (68.2)	22.4 (72.3)	23.8 (74.8)	23.5 (74.3)	22.1 (71.8)	18.9 (66.0)	18.4 (65.1)	15.7 (60.3)	18.6 (65.5)
Average rainfall mm (inches)	5 (0.2)	1 (0.0)	0 (0)	3 (0.1)	8 (0.3)	3 (0.1)	25 (1.0)	37 (1.5)	9 (0.4)	8 (0.3)	6 (0.2)	4 (0.2)	109 (4.3)
Source: climate.data.org

== See also ==
- Railway stations in Sudan
