= National Democratic Alliance (Sudan) =

Sudanese Political Alliance

The National Democratic Alliance (NDA; Arabic: التحالف الوطني الديمقراطي, romanized: al-Taḥāluf al-Waṭanī al-Dīmuqrāṭī) is a group of Sudanese political parties that was formed in 1989 to oppose the regime of Omar al-Bashir after he seized power in a military coup on June 6, 1989. The NDA signed a deal with the Sudanese government on June 18, 2005, following a peace agreement to end the Second Sudanese Civil War on January 9, 2005. Some issues have yet to be resolved by opposing factions, including the conflict and humanitarian issues in the war-torn region of Darfur. After further violent clashes in the east, a separate peace deal was signed with the Beja Congress in October 2006.

The Leadership Council of the NDA includes the following organizations:

- The Democratic Unionist Party (DUP)
- The Umma Party
- The Sudan People's Liberation Movement and Sudan People's Liberation Army (SPLM/SPLA)
- The Union of Sudan African Parties (USAP)
- The Communist Party of Sudan (CPS)
- The General Council of the Trade Unions Federations
- The Legitimate Command of the Sudanese Armed Forces
- The Beja Congress
- The Sudanese National Alliance
- The Sudan Federal Democratic Alliance
- The Rashaida Free Lions
- The Arab Ba'ath Socialist Party
- Independent National Figures
- Representatives of the Liberated Areas
- Sudanese National Party

== History ==
The main leaders of NDA were able to leave Sudan in 1989-1990 (Mohamed Osman al-Mirghani of the DUP, Mubarak al Fadil al Mahdi of the Umma Party, and Izzeddin Ali Amer of the CPS). In Diaspora they began working on overthrowing the government. The repression in the north and the war in the south helped to drive their cause. The initial plan was to organize a popular uprising like the October 1964 Revolution and 1985 Sudanese coup d'état, but some groups like the SPLM and the Beja Congress felt that a military force was needed to protect the demonstrators. After the failure of peace talks between the GOS (Government of Sudan) and the SPLM in Abuja in 1992 and 1993 and the IGAD peace initiative in 1994, In the latter year, the NDA reached a cooperation agreement with the SPLA signed in Shogdom, South Sudan.

The NDA established their own radio channel announced in a press conference in London, August 24 1995. The radio channel broadcast in SPLM held areas in Southern Sudan.

After the withdrawal of the Umma Party in March 2000 from the NDA and the obvious ineffectiveness of the military actions in Eastern Sudan, a new strategy of a Negotiated Solution was adopted. This tactic was followed reluctantly at the beginning, but was generally regarded as the only viable way out.
