= Eastern Sudan =

Geographic region of the Republic of Sudan

Eastern Sudan States Coordinating Council Majlis al-Tansiq Lidual Sharq as-Sudan
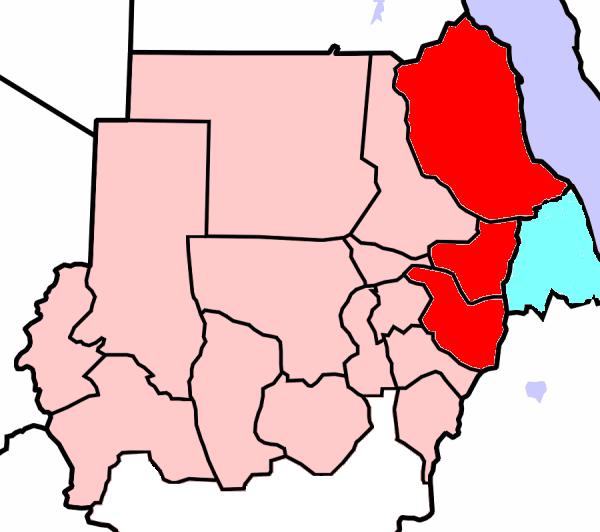
- Kassala, Red Sea, Qadarif states in Sudan
- Formation: 2006
- Type: Coordinating council
- Region served: Eastern Sudan
- Members: 15 members
- Official language: Arabic and English
- Parent organization: Government of Sudan

Eastern Sudan is a geographic region of the Republic of the Sudan made up of the three three eastern states of the Republic of the Sudan; Kassala, Red Sea and Al Qadarif.

== Regional administration ==
The Eastern Sudan States Coordinating Council is a body established by the Eastern Sudan Peace Agreement signed by the Government of Sudan and the rebel Eastern Front in June 2006. The agreement also established an Eastern Sudan Reconstruction and Development Fund to aid wealth-sharing between the central government and the three states. It requires the President of Sudan to appoint one Assistant to the President from nominees presented by the Eastern Front.

=== Membership of the council ===
The council has the following 15 members:

- The Governor of Kassala
- The Governor of Red Sea
- The Governor of Al Qadarif
- The Speaker of the Assembly of Kassala
- The Speaker of the Assembly of Red Sea
- The Speaker of the Assembly of Al Qadarif
- Three representatives of the Eastern Front
- Six representatives from other political groups

The three state Governors chair the proceedings of the council on a rotational basis.

=== Power-sharing principles of the Eastern Sudan Peace Agreement ===
In addition to the establishment of the Eastern Sudan States Coordinating Council and the Eastern Sudan Reconstruction and Development Fund, the peace agreement also allocated the following political positions to East Sudanese people:

==== Federal level ====
- One Assistant to the President
- One advisor to the President of Sudan
- Two Cabinet Ministers and two State Ministers
- Eignt seats of the National Assembly shall be allocated to the Eastern Front

==== State level ====
- The Deputy-Governor of Kassala shall be nominated by the Eastern Front
- The Deputy-Governor of Al Qadarif shall be nominated by the Eastern Front
- One Minister in the executive of Red Sea state
- Ten seats in the legislative assemblies of each of the three states
