= Red Sea Governorate =

Governorate of Egypt

Red Sea Governorate محافظة البحر الأحمر
- Governorate
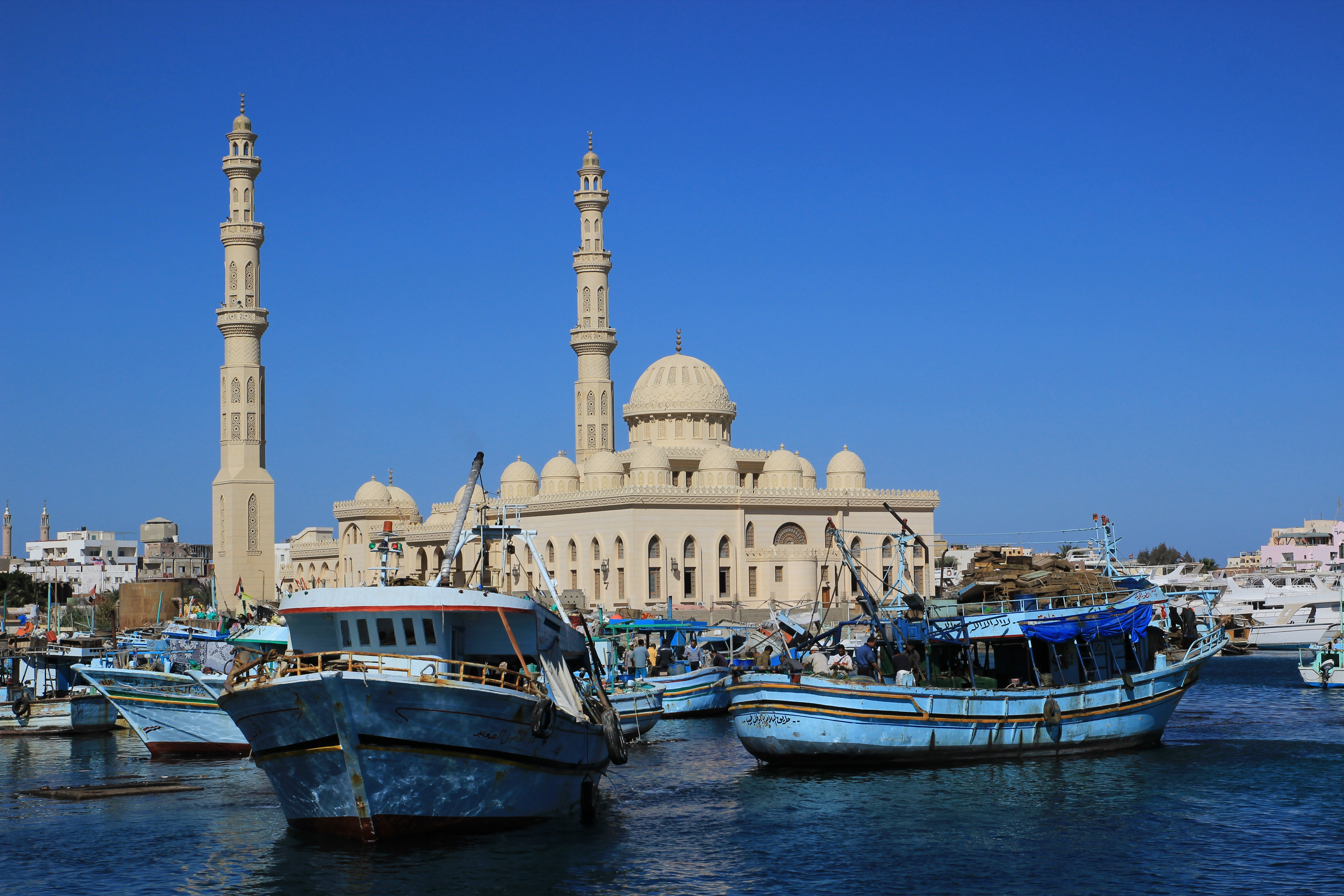
- Hurghada port mosque

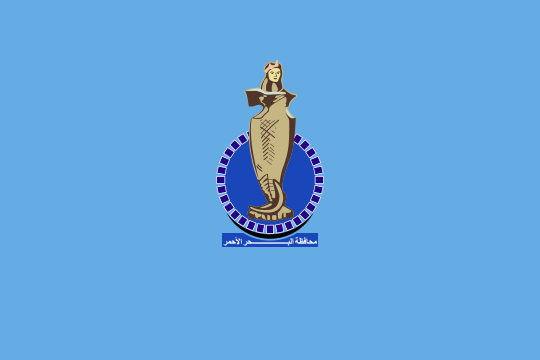
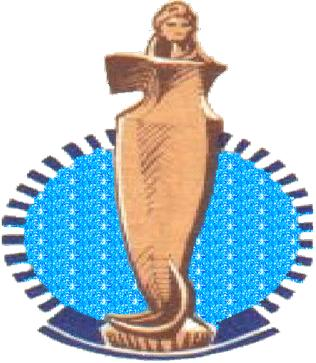
- Flag

- Red Sea Governorate on the map of Egypt
- Coordinates: 25°32′1″N 33°26′18″E
- Country: Egypt
- Seat: Hurghada (capital)

Government
  - Governor: Walid Abdel-Azim

Area
  - Total: 119,099 km^{2} (45,984 sq mi)

Population (January 2024)
  - Total: 410,229
  - Density: 3.44444/km^{2} (8.92105/sq mi)

GDP
  - Total: EGP 76 billion (US$ 4.8 billion)
- Time zone: UTC+2 (EGY)
  - Summer (DST): UTC+3 (EEST)
- HDI (2021): 0.738 high · 10th
- Website: www.redsea.gov.eg

Historical population
Year	Pop.	±%
1937	9,914	—
1947	15,929	+60.7%
1957	N/A	—
1966	38,000	—
1976	56,191	+47.9%
1986	90,491	+61.0%
1996	157,314	+73.8%
2006	288,661	+83.5%
2017	361,480	+25.2%
2018E	366,000	+1.3%
2023E	400,069	+9.3%

The Red Sea Governorate (Arabic: محافظة البحر الأحمر, romanized: Muḥāfaẓat al-Baḥr al-Aḥmar) is one of the 27 governorates of Egypt. Located between the Nile and the Red Sea in the southeast of the country, its southern border forms part of Egypt's border with Sudan. Its capital and largest city is Hurghada.

== Municipal divisions ==
The governorate is divided into multiple municipal divisions with a total estimated population of 410,229 as of January 2024. In the case of Red Sea governorate, some are fully urban, some are fully rural, and some are a combination of both.

Municipal Divisions
Anglicized name	Native name	Arabic transliteration	Population (January 2023 Est.)	Type
Hurghada 1	قسم أول الغردقة	Al-Ghurdaqah 1	83,888	Kism (fully urban)
Hurghada 2	قسم ثان الغردقة	Al-Ghurdaqah 2	128,713	Kism (fully urban)
El Qusair	قسم القصير	Al-Quṣayr	53,230	Kism (urban and rural parts)
Shalateen	قسم الشلاتين	Ash-Shalātīn	13,761	Kism (urban and rural parts)
Halaib	قسم حلايب	Ḥalāyib	8,312	Kism (fully rural)
Marsa Alam	قسم مرسى علم	Marsā 'Alam	9,147	Kism (urban and rural parts)
Ras Ghareb	قسم رأس غارب	Ras Ghārib	46,297	Kism (urban and rural parts)
Safaga	قسم سفاجا	Safājā	56,721	Kism (urban and rural parts)

== Geography ==
Administratively, the Red Sea Governorate is bordered in the north by the Suez Governorate, to the east by the Red Sea, and to the west by the governorates of Aswan, Qena, Sohag, Asyut, Minya and Beni Suef. In the south it is bordered by Sudan's Red Sea State. It contains the disputed territory of the Halaib Triangle, including the Siyal Islands, and contains the Red Sea Hills, a mountain chain making up the Itbay region of Eastern Egypt and Sudan.

== Population ==
The Red Sea Governorate has seen large percentage increases in population in recent decades, and has a population of 400,069 as of 2023.

== Industrial zones ==
According to the Governing Authority for Investment and Free Zones (GAFI), the following industrial zones are located in the Red Sea Governorate:

Zone name
Alaki 1
Alaki 2
Baranis 1
Baranis 2

== Economy ==
The coast is a tourist destination. Since the early 1980s, Hurghada has been a popular destination for beach lovers and scuba divers. Tourism is also growing in the southern cities of Al-Qusair, Safaga and Marsa Alam. In addition to the numerous hotels and tourist establishments in the centers are located in Al-Bahr al-Ahmar 2 official nature reserves are to be developed for tourism or. The Wadi al-Gamal National Park (Valley of the camels) at Hamata near the town of Marsa Alam and the Gebel Elba National Park in disputed Halaib Triangle north of the town of Halaib. Besides a strong tourism industry, there is also a large offshore fishing industry. The area, which extends over the province, is rich in minerals, such as in phosphates. The Ras Gharib region contains 70% of Egypt's oil production.
