= Red Sea State =

State of Sudan

Red Sea State ولاية البحر الأحمر Wilāyat al-Baḥr al-ʾAḥmar
- State
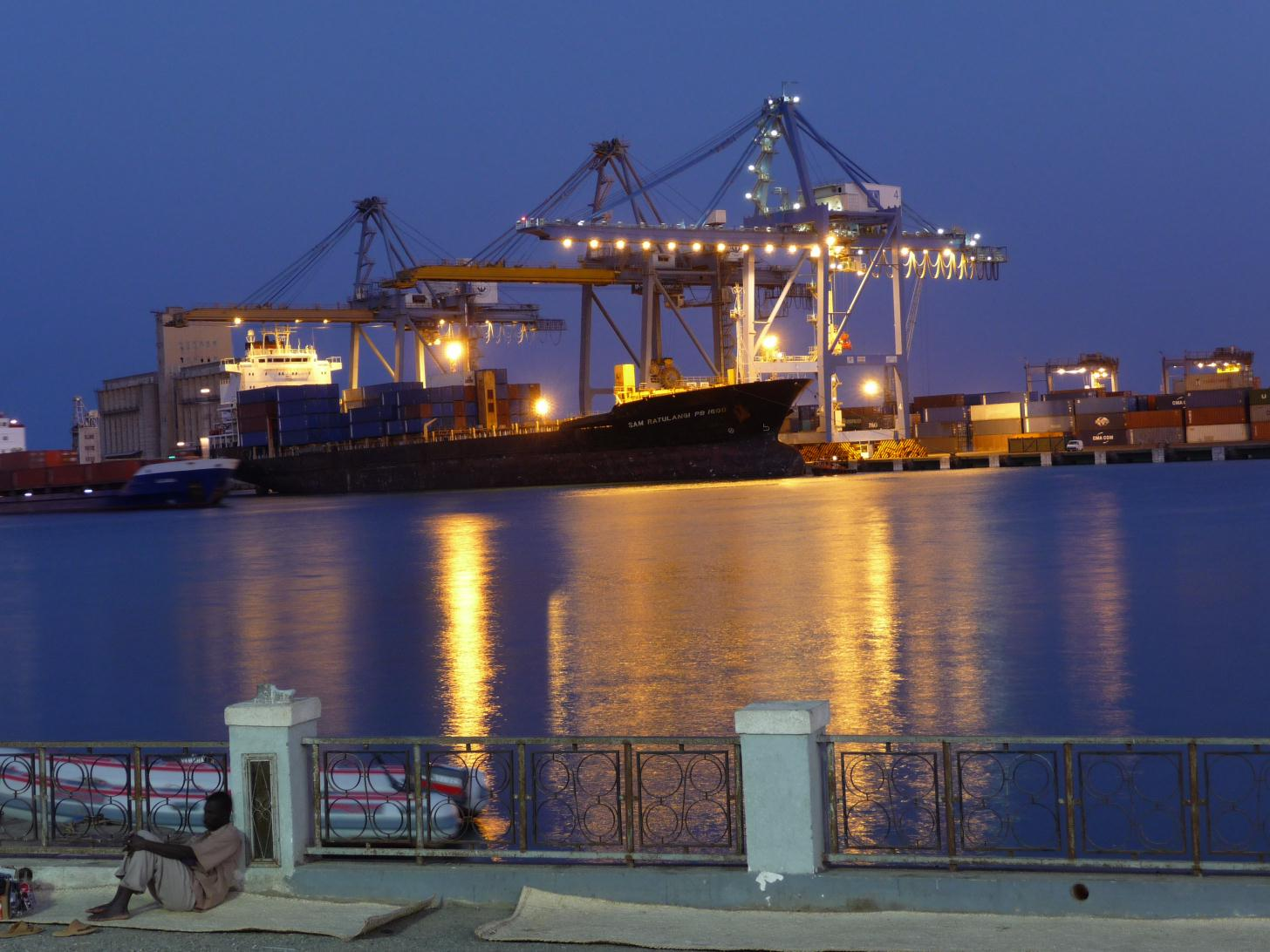
- Port Sudan

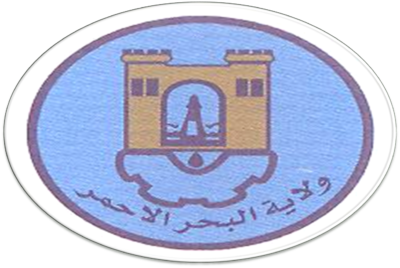
- Seal

- Location in Sudan.
- Coordinates: 19°35′N 35°37′E
- Country: Sudan
- Region: Eastern Sudan States Coordinating Council
- Capital: Port Sudan

Government
  - Governor: Mustafa Mohamed Nour

Area
  - Total: 218,887 km^{2} (84,513 sq mi)

Population (2018)
  - Total: 1,482,053
  - Density: 6.6/km^{2} (17/sq mi)
- Time zone: UTC+2 (CAT)
- HDI (2023): 0.526 low

Red Sea State (Arabic: ولاية البحر الأحمر, Wilāyat al-Baḥr al-ʾAḥmar) is one of the 18 wilayat (states) of Sudan. It covers an area of about 218,887 km^{2} and has an estimated population of 1.48 million. The state borders Egypt to the north, River Nile State to the west, Kassala State to the south, Eritrea to the southeast, and the Red Sea to the east. Its capital and largest city is Port Sudan, which serves as Sudan's main seaport and handles around 90% of the country's international trade, making the state Sudan's only maritime outlet to the Red Sea and the Indian Ocean. Much of Sudan's coastline lies within Red Sea State, giving it strategic and economic importance, and more than half of its population lives in urban areas. Sudan also claims the Halaib Triangle on the northern frontier as part of Red Sea State, although the area is administered by Egypt and remains the subject of an ongoing territorial dispute.

== History ==
The coastal and mountain zones that now form Red Sea State have been occupied intermittently since the Pleistocene and played a role in early Nile–Red Sea interaction. Archaeological evidence from the Eastern Desert shows human presence from Middle Paleolithic times and continuing occupation through the Neolithic, with material and textual traces connecting the Red Sea littoral to the Nile Valley in Pharaonic periods. The wider Red Sea littoral functioned as an interface for trade and movement between Africa and Arabia, and ancient inscriptions and archaeological sites attest to maritime and overland links spanning Pharaonic, Greco-Roman and later periods.

In the medieval period, Suakin developed as the principal port linking northeastern Africa with the Arabian Peninsula and the wider Indian Ocean world. Coral-built Red Sea architecture on Suakin dates mainly from the 15th–20th centuries, and the town served for centuries as an African pilgrimage port en route to Mecca and as a regional trading hub. Local Beja groups and coastal traders jointly controlled much of the town's economic life. Suakin and the coastal littoral entered Ottoman administration in the 16th century, and thereafter oscillated in importance with changes in regional trade and imperial priorities. The Red Sea coast also experienced episodic interventions by Egyptian and later British forces. In the late 19th century, Suakin was fortified during the Mahdist period however, the opening of the Suez Canal and subsequent development of Port Sudan led to Suakin's decline as the principal port.

Port Sudan, founded in 1909 became the dominant harbour for northeastern Sudan in the 20th century. Throughout colonial and early post-independence decades, the Red Sea littoral retained strategic significance because of its ports, caravan routes and resource corridors; local coastal towns remained closely linked to inland caravan networks and pastoral lifeways of the Beja and allied groups.

The Beja peoples of the Red Sea Hills and coastal fringe developed adaptive, multi-resource lifeways combining pastoralism, seasonal migration and participation in coastal trade. Ethnographic and historical research emphasizes long-term cultural continuity alongside material and social change; twentieth-century droughts, state development schemes and urban pull factors encouraged sedentarization and closer economic ties with the Nile Valley and Port Sudan.

Political marginalisation in eastern Sudan contributed to the formation of the Beja Congress in the 1950s as a vehicle for regional grievance and representation. In the 1990s–2000s elements of Beja political activism took up arms and, in coalition with other groups like the Rashaida Free Lions formed the Eastern Front. The Eastern Front waged a low-intensity insurgency focused on control of strategic transport and resource infrastructure and pressed demands over political representation and resource sharing. An Asmara-brokered set of negotiations led to the Eastern Sudan Peace Agreement (ESPA) of 14 October 2006, which provided for integration of fighters, political posts and development transfers for the eastern states; implementation, however, was incomplete and tensions, protests and complaints over allocation of reconstruction funds persisted in the following years.

In May 2026, it was reported that toxic gold mining waste had started killing camels throughout the state.

=== Sudanese civil war (2023–present) ===
Since fighting between the Sudan Armed Forces and the Rapid Support Forces began in April 2023, Port Sudan has served as a de facto administrative centre and refuge for displaced people and some national institutions that left Khartoum.

The city and its port infrastructure have been repeatedly targeted by drone and air strikes, causing damage to fuel depots, power, and container facilities and disrupting maritime and humanitarian logistics.

== Geography ==
Red Sea State occupies northeastern Sudan and contains the country's only coastline along the Red Sea. The region is defined by sharp environmental contrasts, extending from a narrow coastal plain inland to the Red Sea Hills, which rise abruptly and run roughly parallel to the coast in a north–south direction. These hills form part of the Red Sea rift system and dominate much of the state's interior landscape. The terrain is dissected by numerous seasonal watercourses (khors) that flow eastward toward the coast or dissipate inland during periods of low rainfall.

The geology of the state is dominated by Precambrian formations. The Red Sea Hills are composed principally of gneiss and granites, intruded by later igneous dykes that are often visible at the surface. Basaltic and other volcanic rocks occur in places. Mineralized zones, including gold-bearing dykes, are present in parts of the hills and have been exploited since antiquity.

Along the coast, sedimentary processes have produced important alluvial features, the Tokar Delta south of Port Sudan and the smaller Arbaʽat Delta to the north. The Tokar Delta is the more significant of the two and is characterized by fertile soils formed through annual silt deposition by seasonal floods. Estimates cited by local authorities indicate that several centimeters of new silt are deposited each year, reducing the need for artificial fertilization and supporting sustained cultivation. These deltaic areas contrast with the generally shallow, stony soils of the surrounding hills and plains.

The climate of Red Sea State is arid to semi-arid, with precipitation that is both low and highly variable. Rainfall increases toward the southern part of the state and in higher elevations of the Red Sea Hills, where orographic effects enhance condensation. Most rain is associated with the summer movement of the Intertropical Convergence Zone, while limited winter rainfall affects parts of the coastal zone. This variability results in pronounced fluctuations in surface water availability and vegetation cover from year to year.

Vegetation is generally sparse but shows strong seasonal variation. Satellite-based Normalized Difference Vegetation Index (NDVI) analysis demonstrates that pasture and plant cover expand significantly following good rains and contract to isolated pockets during dry periods. Higher and more persistent vegetation is found along khors, deltas, and some foothill areas, while much of the interior supports only ephemeral growth. These patterns closely reflect rainfall distribution and directly influence land use and settlement.

Land use in the state reflects these environmental constraints. Agriculture is concentrated in the Tokar Delta and along seasonal watercourses, where floodwater and small-scale irrigation support the cultivation of sorghum, millet, cotton, and vegetables. Outside these areas, pastoralism is the dominant livelihood. Herders rely on seasonal mobility, herd diversification, and access to scattered grazing areas to manage climatic uncertainty. The availability of pasture and water strongly shapes patterns of movement, economic activity, and settlement across the state.

== Demographics ==
=== Population ===
Red Sea State has an estimated population of 1.6 million. The population is approximately evenly split between urban and rural residents.

=== Languages ===
Arabic is the administrative and principal language of the state, used in government and educational settings. The Beja speak Bidhaawyeet, which exhibits identifiable regional varieties. The Ababda and Rashaida speak Arabic, while the Beni Amer primarily speak Tigre.

=== Ethnic composition ===
Red Sea State is mostly inhabited by the Beja, a Cushitic speaking pastoralist people. The Beja are divided into several subgroups, including the Ababda, Amarar, Bishariin and Hadendoa. Other ethnic groups present in the state include the Beni Amer and the Rashaida. The state is also home to Sudanese Arabs and Nuba peoples, many of whom are concentrated in urban centres such as Port Sudan.

== Localities ==
- Port Sudan (Capital)
- Halaib
- Sawakin
- Sinkat
- Tokar
- Ar Kaweit

== Districts ==
Districts of Red Sea

1. Halayeb District
2. Port Sudan District
3. Sinkat District
4. Tokar District
