= Gabal Elba =

Mountain in the Halaib Triangle of Northeast Africa

Elba Mountain

Highest point
- Elevation: 1,435 m (4,708 ft)
- Coordinates: 22°11′16″N 36°22′14″E

Naming
- Native name: جَبَل علْبَة (Arabic)

Geography
- Location within Egypt Location within Sudan
- Location: Egypt / Sudan; Northeast Africa

Gabal Elba (Arabic: جَبَل علْبَة Gabal ʿElba, Egyptian Arabic pronunciation: [ˈɡæbæl ˈʕelbæ], "Box Mountain"), or Elba Mountain, is a mountain as well as a mountainous area in the Halaib Triangle of Northeast Africa. It is claimed by both Egypt and Sudan, but is under Egyptian control.

== Geography ==
The higher peaks in the area are Gabal Elba (1,435 m (4,708 ft)), Gabal Shellal (1,409 m (4,623 ft)), Gabal Shendib (1,910 m (6,270 ft)) and Gabal Shendodai (1,526 m (5,007 ft)).

Average annual rainfall in the region is less than 50 mm (2.0 in), but orographic precipitation in and around Gabal Elba itself amounts to as much as 400 mm (16 in). in the upper areas.

Gabal Elba National Park

This phenomenon is due to the proximity of the Red Sea coast (some 15–30 km (9.3–18.6 miles) east of the mountains) and also to the fact that the coast, slightly curved to the east at this point, presents an unusually broad front to the sea across a 20–25 km (12–16 miles) strip of relatively flat land, which facilitates interception of moisture-laden north-east sea winds. This phenomenon is registered at its best in the northeast of the region, where Gabal Elba is located, which explains the fact that Gabal Elba receives higher precipitation than other coastal mountains in the range, including higher ones. Aridity gradually increases to the southwest of the area.

== Ecology ==
Gabal Elba's summit is a "mist oasis" where much of the precipitation is contributed in the form of dew, mist and clouds, creating a unique ecosystem not found anywhere else in the country. Indeed, Gabal Elba is a "biodiversity hotspot", with a biological diversity unparalleled in any terrestrial environment in Egypt proper. The relative abundance of moisture supports a diverse flora of some 458 plant species – almost 25% of plant species recorded for the entire country. Many Afrotropical species have their northern limits at Gabal Elba, and the dense cover of acacias and other scrubs represents the only natural woodland in Egypt.

In the higher-elevation mist zone, species of acacia, Moringa and Gabal Elba dragon tree (Dracaena ombet) form the woodland tree canopy, with ferns, mosses and succulents in the understory. The mountain intercepts moisture-bearing winds from the northeast, and the northern and northeastern slopes are more humid than the western and southern slopes. Savannas of acacia and Delonix grow in the foothills and along watercourses. The mountain is home to the largest remaining population of Dracaena ombet in Egypt and Sudan.

41 species of birds breed in and around Gabal Elba. The bateleur (Terathopius ecaudatus), Namaqua dove (Oena capensis), Nubian nightjar (Caprimulgus nubicus), shining sunbird (Cinnyris habessinicus), Arabian warbler (Curruca leucomelaena), rosy-patched bushshrike (Rhodophoneus cruentus), African silverbill (Euodice cantans), and Sudan golden sparrow (Passer luteus) are Afrotropical species who reach the northern extent of their range on Gabal Elba. Other native species are the black-crowned sparrow-lark (Eremopterix nigriceps), fulvous babbler (Argya fulva), and common ostrich (Struthio camelus), and the raptors Nubian vulture (Torgos tracheliotos), bearded vulture (Gypaetus barbatus), Egyptian vulture (Neophron percnopterus), Verreaux's eagle (Aquila verreauxii), and Bonelli's eagle (Aquila fasciata).

=== National park ===
The Gabal Elba National Park (22.90°N 35.34°E), declared by Egyptian Prime Minister Ahmed Nazif in 1986, covers some 35,600 km^{2} (13,700 sq mi), including most of the disputed Halaib Triangle (except its westernmost corner), and an area of comparable size just north of it. It is also known to potentially hold the last population of the Nubian wild ass. However, the purity of these animals is questionable.

On December 16, 2014 an adult male leopard was killed by a group of shepherds after it attacked their camel in Wadi Shalal, in the region of Halaib in the extreme southeast of Egypt. This was the first sighting of a leopard in Egypt since the 1950s.

In the winter of 2024, a spotted hyena was killed by local residents in the Gabal Elba Protected Area. It was the first documented occurrence of the species in modern Egypt since its extinction over 5,000 years ago. Researchers explored the potential influence of increased rainfall and grazing activities in facilitating a dispersal corridor for hyenas from neighboring Sudan. The record was located 500 km (310 mi) north of the species' previously known range.
