= Rashaida people =

Ethnic group in Eritrea and Sudan

Rashaida رشايدة
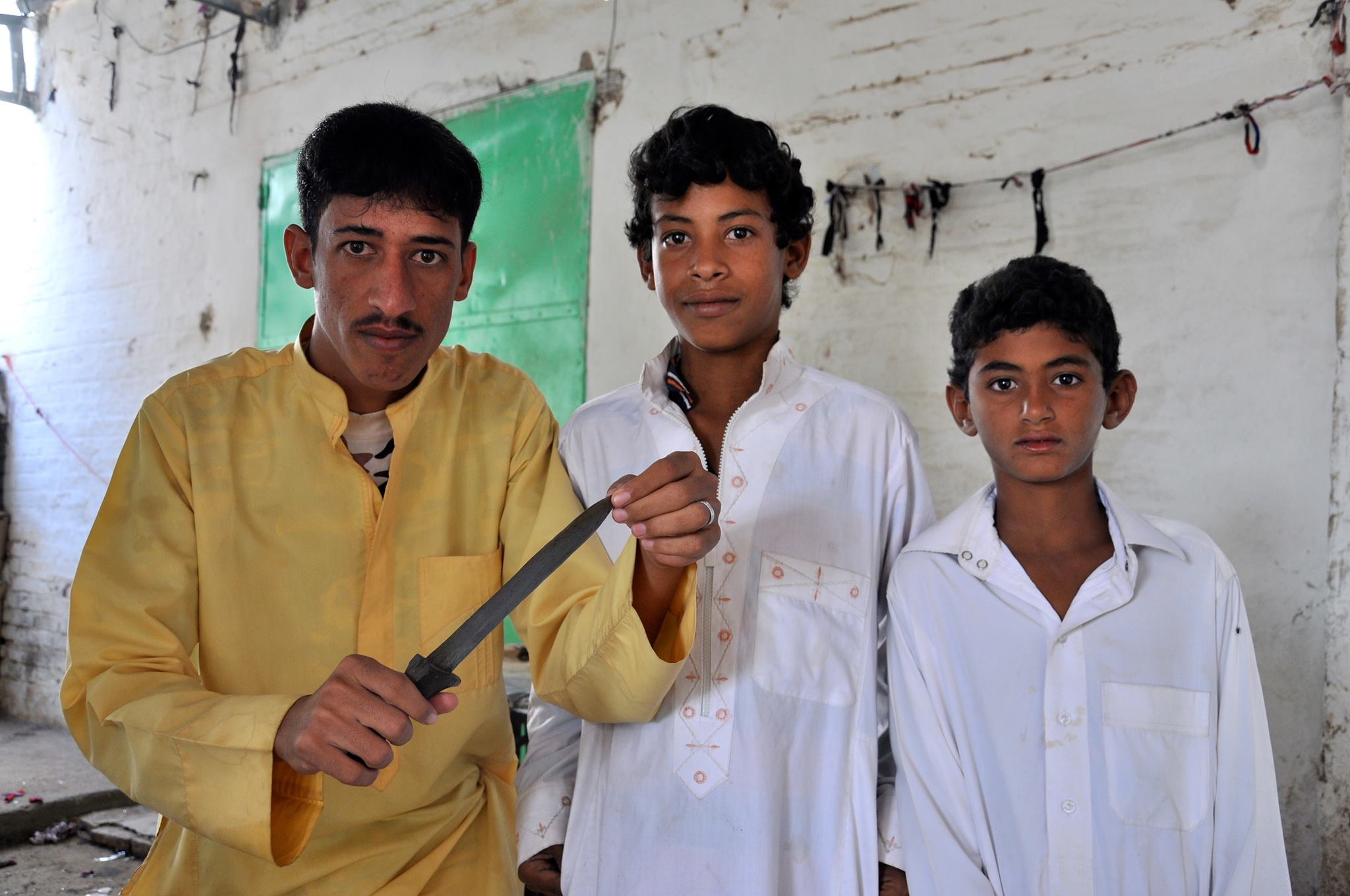
- Rashaida boys with their father near Kassala in Eastern Sudan

Total population
- 130,000–180,000

Regions with significant populations
- Red Sea coastal plains
- Eritrea: 60,000-80,000
- Sudan: 68,000

Languages
- Hejazi Arabic, Sudanese Arabic

Religion
- Sunni Islam

Related ethnic groups
- Arabs

The Rashaida (Arabic: رشايدة), also known as Bani Rasheed, are a Bedouin ethnic group inhabiting the coastal plain of the Red Sea stretching from the Sudanese city of Port Sudan to the Eritrean city of Massawa. They are the descendants of Arab tribes people from Hejaz, and Najd descending from the Banu Abs tribe, who fled the Arabian peninsula in 1846 as the Saudis rose to power. They are mostly nomadic and constitute 60,000–80,000 people in Eritrea and 68,000 people in Sudan, mainly in the eastern part around Kassala.

Across Eritrea and Sudan, the Rashaida keep their traditional dress, culture, customs, camel breeds and practice of Sunni Islam. In Eritrea, Rashaida people are commonly confused with Adeni Arabs, a small group of about 18,000 Arabs from Aden, who tend to cohabit similar regions as the Rashaida. Although Adeni Arabs originally hail from Yemen and tend to live in a more geographically concentrated area of Eritrea, mainly in the port city of Massawa, Rashaida people tend to live along the Red Sea Coast from Massawa Eritrea to Port Sudan Sudan and to the Sinai in places as far north as Egypt.

== History ==
The Rashaida descended from Arabic-speaking Bedouins who migrated from coastal towns in the Hejaz region of present-day Saudi Arabia, and sailed across the Red Sea in the late 1860s. They settled in what the Egyptian administration at the time referred to as the Suakin and Massawa governorates.

The boundary between these provinces roughly aligned with the present-day Sudanese–Eritrean border. However, from 1866 to 1895, this was a loosely controlled frontier zone that the Rashaida crossed freely. Even today, some Rashaida move between Sudan and Eritrea whenever they need to escape political or economic pressures in either country.

Significant numbers of Rashaida crossed the border in 1885 to flee the Mahdists in Sudan, in 1892 to evade Italian tax collectors in Italian Eritrea, in 1935 to prevent the Italian seizure of their livestock in Eritrea, and in the late 1990s to avoid clashes in eastern Sudan between the Sudanese Army and the National Democratic Alliance, a Sudanese opposition group based in Eritrea. As of 1998, the Rashaida were the smallest ethnic group present in Eritrea.

They have been mostly nomadic and as of 2005 constituted 187,500 people in Eritrea and 68,000 people in Sudan, mainly in the eastern part around Kassala and to the Northern Sinai Peninsula of Egypt. Despite their size, they reportedly wield great influence as the organizers and business leaders who manage much of the black-market activity supporting Eritrea's economy.

== Culture ==
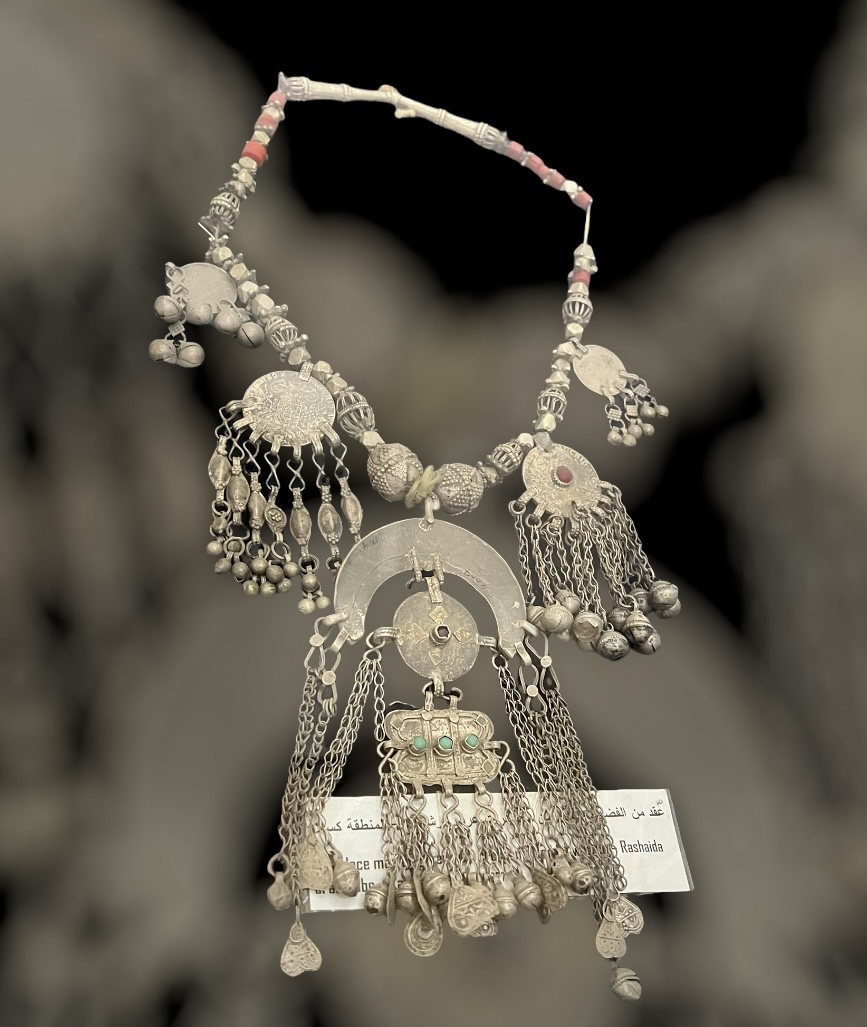
Rashaida silver jewelry, Sudan Ethnographic Museum 2022

=== Clothing ===
The most important part of the wardrobe for the women is their veil; which they begin wearing around the age of five.

The women explain their observance of the veil in terms of beauty, not the Islamic religion. "We feel you are more beautiful when you wear a veil," Mrs. Hamida said. "When we are 5 years old we ask our mothers if we can be veiled so we can be like them."

These veils cover their whole face apart from their eyes and are finely embroidered with metallic silver thread, beads and sometimes seed pearls. These veils cover their faces at all times, even when they eat unless there is no male present except for their husband as no other male will ever see their face. Unlike a number of other Arab/Muslim cultures, the women are able to keep part of their hair uncovered. The Rashaida women are also said to be typically adorned in silver jewellery which the women craft themselves and often sell at local markets. The rest of their outfits are also said to be elaborate with long skirts and bright colours; being particularly famous for their black-and-red geometrically patterned dresses. When looking at the hemming of the Rashaida women's dresses, it is clear to see the influences of their Arabian ancestry through the continued use of bold appliqué patterns. When they first migrated to Eritrea, they were said to be wearing these traditional red ankle-length skirts that were adorned with bright yellow and green patterns.

The men traditionally wear a thawb and a white turban but sometimes they can be seen wearing colourful turbans.

=== Marriage ===
Due to the inability of Rashaidi men and women to freely interact in everyday life, marriages are most often arranged by the families. If the groom accepts the marriage, he must pay a dowry which is usually in the form of cash and camels. A woman can only take one husband, but a man may have multiple wives.

The traditional wedding of the Rashaida group involves a seven-day event involving a number of festivities like drumming, dancing and camel racing. During the events on the first six days, the bride is unable to see anyone during the daylight except for mother, sisters and her father's other wives. On the seventh day, the bride joins her husband in daylight for the festivities, and they begin their public life as husband and wife. During this period, an important custom for the Rashaida people is ensuring that the bride is concealed in elaborate veils and wedding masks during the week of festivities. During the first six days she wears the 'mangheb', the young girl's veil. On the seventh day, she wears a specific 'burqa' which is given to her by her mother and decorated in metallic thread and pendants that are gifted to her from her husband. She will continue to wear this wedding burqa for a year after the wedding. She is only able to unveil herself outside the presence of her family on the seventh night when she is married to her husband; this is when he sees her uncovered for the first time.

During the festivities, men commonly wear a cotton tunic with an embroidered waistcoat and a turban. An important token during the wedding, is the groom's ceremonial sword which he uses during the festive dances and is gifted to him by his parents.

The Rashaida people wish to maintain a level of ethnic purity within their community. It is rare to see interracial marrying as they are discouraged from marrying outside of the group to prevent their offspring from being a mix with other races. but it is very common to see them mixing with the highlanders.

Within the Rashaida group, there are said to be two different 'races'. Those that have lighter skin are referred to as "Red" while the freed slaves who were raised by the Rashaida are referred to as the "Black", with the term 'muwalladin' or 'Muwallad' also often being used to label them. There are certain rules regarding the ability of these two groups to intermarry. A male that is considered "Red" is able to marry a "Black" Rashaidi as their offspring will be considered "Red", while a "Black" male is unable to marry a "Red" Rashaidi.

=== Hospitality ===
Most Arab groups have very distinct hospitality practices that revolve around the value of being generous, offering their home to both strangers and friends alike. It is an important factor in social relations as it is part of the foundation for a good reputation. These Arab hospitality practices can also be seen in the traditional practices of the Rashaida people. When guests are entertained in their homes, they are greeted, fed and entertained according to a set of established rules. For example, there cannot be an offering of hospitality within the household unless a senior woman is present.

When the Rashaida hosts their guests, they treat it as a ritual and host it in their tents, designated spaces for significant ritual events such as childbirth and marriage. These tents, along with the ones they live in, are mostly made from goatskin or of animal hair from their camel herds but can also be made from sheep or goat hair. As this is treated as a ritual, there is a particular order of activities that take place. This sequence is as follows:

1. The guests are greeted
2. They are served beverages in the order of water, then tea and then coffee.
3. An animal is killed for the meal, and the knife is presented to the guests
4. A broth is cooked from the animal and served to the guests
5. The meat itself is served
6. Cooked grain is then served to the guests
7. Words of gratitude are given and the guests depart

== Rashaida in Sudan ==
During the middle of the 19th century, this group of ethnic people migrated to Sudan from the west coast of Arabia, predominantly Saudi Arabia, and settled in the eastern part of the nation. The total number of Rashaida living in Sudan is unclear but it is estimated to be around forty thousand people. From the early 2000s, many Rashaida people have become more or less settled in the Lower Atbara area of the region. Here, they mostly live in tents or newly constructed huts or adobe houses.

The Rashaida people's relationships with other ethnic groups in the region are mostly due to the practices they have adopted since they migrated to the country. They adopted the pastoral production and agriculture methods also practised by other peoples in the area; such as the Hadendoa. These tribes then retaliated against the new competition by violently opposing the expansion of the Rashaida into the coastal areas, forcing many of them to settle further inland. The arid conditions of these areas then led to them raising camels rather than cattle.

=== Ancestry ===
A paper released in 2022, showed that the Rashaida Arab Bedouin tribe from Sudan has the highest values for Middle Eastern-related ancestry at 95.1% compared to any other populations in the study. This Middle Eastern ancestry was even higher than the studied populations from Yemen (75.8%) or Lebanon (57.3%). The Rashaida population also showed a lack of geneflow from any neighboring African groups, which was said to be consistent with their migratory history into the region from Arabia. The Rashaida Arabs had the closest genetic affinity to Saudi Arabian, and populations from Yemen.

=== Pastoralism ===
Camel breeding is one of the primary sources of work for the Rashaida people, with the group often living a fully nomadic life as pastoralists. Within the region of Eastern Sudan, in which the Rashaida are predominantly found, pastoralism is a leading way of life for tribes. The Rashaida people utilise their camel herds for multiple purposes. Camel milk is extremely important for the Rashaida people as it is a fundamental source of their vitamins and proteins, making it their primary focus for herding. However, they also produce camels for meat to sell to the Egyptians and for racing which they sell to the Gulf states.

In these regions there are various obstacles such as droughts and widespread famine, meaning that the pastoral groups have had to create various strategies to deal with the complexity of the eco-system. The Rashaida follow a seasonal pattern of migration, with several seasons and consequent living patterns occurring throughout the year. Beginning in mid-July they begin a pattern of migration with their camel herd to follow the rain showers. From the beginning of August to the end of September, there is less movement, and they leave their camels to graze near their campsites, turning their focus to their livestock and agriculture practices. The next season, 'Ad Darat' has more of a focus on finding pasture for the livestock as conditions start to get drier. Milk supplies also start to dwindle, so there is a need to harvest grain crops. The final season is the dry season, in which migration stops and they set up camps near reliable sources of water.

== Social and political issues ==
The Rashaida people have become entwined in several controversies with other groups in the region, governments, and even the international community. For example, since they arrived in Sudan, they have been involved in new forms of economic activity besides pastoralism which has included illegal activity. This has involved actions such as joining rebel groups, participating in the slave trade, and buying/selling weapons. Along with this, it has become known that groups within the Rashaida people are involved in various acts of violence as well as human rights violations.

=== Rashaida Free Lions ===
In Sudan, there is an active armed rebel group within the Rashaida tribe called the Rashaida Free Lions. It was created as a response to the neglect that the group faces by government policy implemented in the region. For example, the leaders of the Rashaida claimed that they were paying levies on their industry but not receiving any services from the government in return. Other ethnic groups also suffered from similar circumstances, with the whole region demonstrating a complete lack of development initiatives. In response, the group became a part of what was known as the Eastern Front; a political alliance between rebel groups in the region. This coalition was formed to create less of a focus on ethnicities and rather unite together to challenge the governmental neglect that the region was being faced with. This group operated out of three separate camps along the border with Eritrea. They have operations that involve activities such as stealing cars and weapons from the army.

=== Human and weapon smuggling ===
Eritrea is a country with a one-party system which has been known for its lack of protection of civil freedoms with human rights violations being committed by the government. It is also one of the least developed countries in the world, making the living conditions poor. Due to these circumstances, thousands of Eritreans have been fleeing the country and seeking asylum in east Sudan, or using it as a passage to other countries. As of 2013 East Sudan itself hosted around 100,000 refugees. The high influx of refugees led to criminal activity along the Eritrean-Sudanese border that involved the abduction and extortion of these refugees. Refugees have been abducted in Sudan and then sold to criminal gangs towards Egypt. This has been recognised to involve the Rashaida people, with a small group being a part of this chain of human trafficking across the Sudanese and Eritrean border. They have been deeply involved in the chain, with the Rashaida tribesman being responsible for ransoming, torturing and killing a large number of the Eritrean refugees. They also use this channel to smuggle weaponry, with the passengers being used to conceal the illegal weapons. Sudan serves as a transit state for the smuggling of weaponry to the Gaza Strip. Smuggling gangs, with a large majority from the Rashaida tribe, are responsible for moving the illegal cargo to the Egyptian border. These patterns of weaponry trading have been long-standing within the group. In past centuries, the Rashaida have been documented for buying illegal weapons from countries such as Egypt, Eritrea, Saudi Arabia and Yemen and then mostly likely trading these weapons for slaves, tobacco and camels. The documented bestial excesses of torture in connection with human trafficking in Sinai have been described as a legacy of the Egyptian dictatorship.
