= Beja Congress =

Political party in Sudan

Beja Congress Arabic: مؤتمر البجا, romanized: Mu'tamar al-Bijā
- Abbreviation: BC
- Spokesperson: Esmat Ali Ibrahim
- Founder: Taha Osman Bileya
- Founded: 1957
- Ideology: Beja nationalism, Self-determination
- National Assembly: 0 / 426

Party flag

Website
- bejacongress.net

The Beja Congress (Arabic: مؤتمر البجا, romanized: Mu'tamar al-Bijā) is a political group comprising several ethnic entities, most prominently the Beja, of eastern Sudan. It was founded in 1957 by Dr. Taha Osman Bileya together with a group of Beja intellectuals, as a political platform for the politically and economically marginalized Beja people. According to the "Black Book", an analysis of Sudanese regional political representation published underground in the late 1990s by Darfur Islamist followers of Hassan al-Turabi, eastern Sudan has been conspicuous since its independence for its political and economic marginalization. This part of Sudan had fewer ministers and representatives than other parts of the country in the civil and military branches of the central government, as well as having among the lowest rates of education and access to health services in the country.

At first the Beja Congress was frustrated in seeking political power: it was banned in 1960, along with all other political parties, by the military junta of General Ibrahim Abboud. Once the ban was lifted in 1964, the party was able to mobilize the educated sector of the eastern Sudan and successfully participated in the 1965 parliamentary elections, with several of its activists winning seats in the constituent assembly. Though it was banned once again during the years of the military government of Gaafar Nimeiry (1969–1985), after the popular uprising of 1985 removed Nimeiry, the Beja Congress participated in the national elections of 1986. The Congress won only one seat in that election, losing to a resurgent Democratic Unionist Party (DUP), which subsequently participated in the Sadiq al-Mahdi-led coalition government of 1986–1989.

With the military takeover of the National Islamic Front government in 1989, the Beja Congress was once again banned. In 1993 the group joined the National Democratic Alliance (NDA) based in Asmara, which had been founded by the DUP and the Umma Party in 1989. In the 1995 the Beja Congress signed the Asmara Declaration. Aided by the Sudan Liberation Movement/Army (SPM/A) and the Eritrean military, armed fighters of the Congress made a series of attacks along the Eritrea–Sudan border, concentrating on strategic assets, such as the Khartoum-Port Sudan road, the oil pipeline, and the military installations defending them. Despite their successes, Young notes, these attacks "did not close the road for more than a few hours or stop the flow of oil for more than a few days." Although the Beja Congress have a significant fighting presence, they achieved a number of modest military victories. With the help of the SPM/A, twice captured Hamishkoreb, before finally holding it from October 2002 until April 2006 when the SPM/A withdrew from the NDA. By itself the Beja Congress held territory around Tokar, one of their historic strongholds, and the town of Khor Telkok near Kassala, which the NDA had declared to be their "capital". Politically the Beja Congress was far more effective, capitalizing on two different incidents in January 2005 where Sudanese security attacked and killed unarmed civilians. Shortly after these events the Beja Congress organized a national conference in which Musa Mohamed Ahmed, was elected chairman of the group. Further, the party has enjoyed some success in uniting its fractious and isolated people: internal clashes are reported to be down in numbers. The Congress has been particularly successful at mobilizing its young people: the student administrations at two of the three main universities in the east are controlled by the Beja Congress and the party is making inroads into even secondary and primary schools. Young observes, "Beja resentment and support for the BC is clear to anyone spending just a short time in the coffee shops of Port Sudan."

Despite this, both the Beja Congress and the Rashaida Free Lions felt marginalized within the NDA. These tensions came to a head after the Egyptian security services organized negotiations between the NCP and the NDA in Cairo in 2004. Both the Beja Congress and the Free Lions walked out of the negotiations, claiming that their interests were not being fairly represented. Two months later the NDA held its annual conference in Asmara amid considerable acrimony. When the DUP, the Sudanese Communist Party, and Legitimate Command components of the NDA entered the Sudan National Assembly shortly afterwards, the NDA was obviously moribund.

When the withdrawal of the SPM/A from the NDA in 2004 led to the collapse of the alliance, the Beja Congress joined with the Rashaida Free Lions and other smaller groups to form the Eastern Front rebel group. However, weak leadership, an inability to reach out to other ethnic groups in eastern Sudan, and dependence on Eritrean support led to the failure of the Eastern Front. The Eastern Sudan Peace Agreement of 14 October 2006 called for the absorption of the Eastern Front armed forces into the Sudanese military in exchange for political positions in the national government, the national assembly, and in three eastern states for the Eastern Front leadership. In making this Agreement, many members of the Eastern Front negotiating team in Asmara are reported to have not been enthusiastic at the final language, and only signed the document because they felt that they had few viable alternatives.
