= Rashaida Free Lions =

Rashaida Arab armed group of east Sudan

The Rashaida Free Lions (Arabic: الأسود الحُرة, al-usud al-hurra) were an armed group of the Rashaida people that was active in the eastern regions of Sudan. The Free Lions were formed in November 1999 by Mabrouk Mubarak Salim.

== History ==
The Rashaida, who migrated from the Arabian Gulf to present-day Sudan during the mid-1800s, have historically faced insecurity due to lack of land rights.

While Sudan sided with Iraq during the Gulf War, the Rashaida joined with the United Arab Emirates to support Kuwait. After the war, the Kuwaiti government rewarded the Rashaida with 400 vehicles which were promptly confiscated by the Sudanese government. Anger over this decision provided the impetus for Mabrouk Mubarak Salim mobilizing the Rashaida Free Lions in 1999.

Along with the Beja Congress and Sudanese National Alliance, the Rashaida Free Lions received extensive support from the government of Eritrea. Despite lack of access to heavy weaponry and a relatively small base of support among the broader Rashaida community, the Rashaida Free Lions under Salim were well-supplied with small arms by the Eritrean Army, funded by successes in trade and business. Supporters of the Rashaida Free Lions often participated part-time in the armed struggle, leaving periodically to return home, while Salim himself was well-known as the grandson of a Rashaida leader, was a former politician, and had earned a PhD.

Starting in 2002, the Rashaida Lions began informally cooperating with the Beja Congress and the Sudan People's Liberation Army. The Rashaida Free Lions signed a memorandum of understanding with the Justice and Equality Movement in 2004, cooperating on a limited number of attacks on government installations. In February 2005, the Rashaida Lions joined with the Beja Congress to form the Eastern Front, united by shared distrust in Ahmed al-Mirghani's influence over the National Democratic Alliance.

After negotiations facilitated by the Eritrean government, the Eastern Sudan Peace Agreement was signed in 2006, with the Rashaida refunded for the loss of their vehicles and their leader Salim being named Minister of Roads and Bridges. The Rashaida Free Lions dumped arms and played no further part in armed struggle.
