= Eritrean nationality law =

Eritrean Nationality Proclamation

Eritrean National Assembly
- Enacted by: Government of Eritrea
- Status: Current legislation

Eritrean nationality law is regulated by the Constitution of Eritrea, as amended; the Eritrean Nationality Proclamation, and its revisions; and various international agreements to which the country is a signatory. These laws determine who is, or is eligible to be, a national of Eritrea. The legal means to acquire nationality, formal legal membership in a nation, differ from the domestic relationship of rights and obligations between a national and the nation, known as citizenship. Nationality describes the relationship of an individual to the state under international law, whereas citizenship is the domestic relationship of an individual and the nation. Eritrean nationality is typically obtained under the principle of jus soli, i.e. by birth in Eritrea, or jus sanguinis, born to a mother or a father of Eritrean origin or parents who came to Eritrea before 1934. It can be granted to persons with an affiliation to the country, or to a permanent resident who has lived in the country for a given period of time through naturalization.

== Acquisition of nationality ==
Nationality can be acquired in Eritrea at birth or later in life through naturalization.

=== By birth ===
Those who acquire nationality at birth include:

- Children born anywhere who have at least one parent who is an Eritrean national; or
- Abandoned children or orphans discovered in the territory whose parents are unknown.

=== By naturalization ===
Naturalization can be granted to persons who have resided in the territory for a sufficient period of time to confirm they understand one of the languages used in Eritrea, customs and traditions of the society. General provisions are that applicants have good character and conduct; have no criminal convictions; have good mental and physical health without disabilities; can economically be self-sufficient; and did not act against the independence movement. After 1974, applicants must have resided in the country for twenty years, with breaks in residency allowed and prior to 1974, have continuously resided there for ten years. Besides foreigners meeting the criteria, other persons who may be naturalized include:

- The spouse of an Eritrean national after a three-year residency period subsequent to the marriage;
- Adoptees whose parents are Eritrean can choose to acquire nationality;
- Minor children can be automatically naturalized when their parent acquires nationality;
- People who descend from a person who came in Eritrea before 1934 are indigenous of Eritrea
- People who resided in Eritrea between 1934 and 1951 are naturalized eritreans, if they were not involved in activities that were against the independence movement.

== Loss of nationality ==
Eritrean nationals can renounce their nationality pending approval by the state. Nationals may be denaturalized in Eritrea for acquiring dual nationality (other than by birth) or serving in the military of another state without government authorization; performing actions against state interests; performing actions indicating one is a national of another state; committing serious crimes, disloyal acts, or crimes against the state or state security; or for fraud, misrepresentation, or concealment in a naturalization petition. Persons who previously had other nationality but married and divorced an Eritrean, or attempted to repatriate to the nationality of their country of origin, may lose their nationality.

== Dual nationality ==
Dual nationality is typically allowed in Eritrea since 1992. Those who had dual status prior to independence require authorization from the government. Those who are born with dual nationality since independence may keep their nationalities, but those who are naturalized are required to renounce other nationality. Persons who serve as president must be born as nationals of Eritrea.

== History ==
=== Ottoman period (1557–1869) ===
From the eighth century, five kingdoms of the Beja people — Baqlin, Bazin, Jarin, Naqis and Qata — stretched from Northeastern Sudan through the Tigray Province of Ethiopia. Rivalry between them led to a continuous state of conflict and decline, allowing the expansion of the Ottoman Empire along the coastline of the Red Sea to gain a foothold in 1517 and consolidate their rule in the Ḥabeş Province by 1557. Establishing a colonial power in what would become Eritrea, the Ottomans imposed their rule for the next 300 years. The western part of the territory of what is now Eritrea was part of the Funj Sultanate, which arose in 1504 and surrendered to the Ottoman Empire's Egyptian Province, in 1821. Within the Ottoman Empire, for six centuries, there was an internal organization that defined government functions for subjects by balancing religious and communal ties, weighing aptitudes and occupations without a centralized national ideology. Ottoman subjecthood was strongly tied to religion and non-Muslims, if they were ahl al-Kitāb (People of the Book), meaning Jewish, Christian, or Zoroastrian, could benefit from being subjects by agreeing to pay a tax to the sultan. Under a pact known as zimma, in exchange for paying taxes, the sultan allowed these subjects freedom of religion and guaranteed their lives, property, and rights with an understanding that they were legally entitled to less status than Muslim subjects. The pact was agreed to by the leaders of the confessional community, who managed the adherents and their internal organization under the religious law of their community.

By the eighteenth century a political organization, known as the millet, managed the affairs of their respective religious communities and developed into the protégé system (Turkish: beratlılar, protected persons). Signing treaties with European powers, from the 1673 signing of a Capitulation with France, the Ottoman Empire granted France control of certain Ottoman Christians, Austria control of some Ottoman Roman Catholics, most favoured nation status to British and Dutch traders, as well as specific rights to the Republic of Venice and Russian Empire. Under the terms of these treaties, foreign powers could recruit Ottoman subjects to serve their needs as commercial agents, consuls, or interpreters, and extend to these protégés diplomatic immunity from prosecution and privileges of trade, including lowered customs tariffs.

Over time, abuses of the system led to a virtual monopoly of foreign trade by protégés, clandestine sales of letters patent (Turkish: berats), and demands from foreign powers for protection to extend from individuals to entire communities. The influence on Ottoman subjects by European powers changed the perception of these minority groups in the empire, meaning that they were increasingly seen not as Ottoman subjects, but as resident aliens. In 1798, France and Britain's conflicts during the Napoleonic Wars extended into Egypt. France occupied the territory until 1801, when the French were defeated and Britain set about assisting the Ottoman Empire in regaining its sovereignty. To curb the disruptive effects of Europeans in the empire, from 1806, the Ottoman government began sending communiques to the foreign embassies demanding compliance with the terms of their agreements. Failing to achieve success diplomatically, in 1839, the Ottoman government issued the Edict of Gülhane, in an effort to end bribery and corruption, and to create fair tax schemes and institutions to protect the basic rights of Ottoman subjects. The Ottoman Reform Edict of 1856 (Turkish: Islâhat Fermânı) categorized subjects by whether they were Muslim or non-Muslim, granting different civil statuses to each. In 1863, new regulations upon protégés restricted the privileges they received in the empire and clarifying who were thereafter considered to be Ottoman subjects and who were foreigners.

To further define subjects of the Ottoman Empire, new nationality legislation was passed in 1869 (tâbiiyet-i osmaniye kanunnamesi, Ottoman Nationality Law). (Note: Will Hanley, a history professor at Florida State University, notes that the etymology of tâbiiyet includes associations with allegiance, nationality, and subjecthood, or an affiliation to a sovereign, but does not translate as citizenship.) The law specified terms for the acquisition and loss of who was within the sovereignty of the empire, rather than the domestic obligations and rights of citizenship. It described who was a subject, owing allegiance, and made provisions for wives, children, emigrants and immigrants. Under its terms, children derived nationality from their fathers, foreigners born in the territory could acquire nationality at majority, and foreigners born elsewhere could obtain nationality after five years residency within the imperial realm. Specific provisions included that foundlings discovered within the territory; stateless persons living in the empire; Muslim women, who despite the ban on such marriages, had married Persian men and the children of such a union; unregistered persons who had not been counted in the Ottoman census, either because no census was taken or their births were unregistered, were all considered to be Ottoman. Foreign women acquired Ottoman nationality through marriage, but could return to their original nationality upon the death of their spouse. Nationality could also be granted based on special contribution or service to the nation. Dual nationality was permitted, but was discouraged, as the government could choose not to recognize naturalization of an Ottoman subject by another state.

When the Suez Canal opened in 1869, an Italian, Lazarist missionary Giuseppe Sapeto was hired to assist in securing a Red Sea port for Italy. Sapeto had first come to Eritrea in 1837 and worked in the Akele Guzai region. He later worked near Keren and was knowledgeable in the language and culture of the region. He acquired land on the Bay of Assab from local chiefs on behalf of the Rubatino Maritime Company, giving Italy a base from which to begin colonization and commercial expansion in the region. Conflict between Egypt and the Abyssinian Empire persisted throughout the 1870s, and in 1876, the northern highlands were annexed by Abyssinia's Yohannes IV. In 1879, the conflict ended and Britain attempted to broker a peace between Egypt and Abyssinia, but was unsuccessful. In 1882, the Italian government purchased the interests of the Rubatino Maritime Company to Assab. As Italian explorers began to widen their spheres of influence, disputes emerged with the Abyssinians. Attacks on an Italian settlement at Dogali in 1887, led to an invasion by Italian military forces. In 1889, Abyssinian Emperor Menelik II, recognized Italian claims and settled the borders of Eritrea by the Treaty of Wuchale.

=== Italian period (1889–1941) ===
Official occupation by Italy began in 1889 and in 1890 the colony was formally named Italian Eritrea. Italian subjecthood was first declared during the Unification of Italy in 1861. As the states united, their former kingdoms and duchies ceased to exist and no alternative means of belonging had been devised. Thus, in March 1861 the former Savoy-Piedmont-Sardinia Kingdom officially proclaimed that the former Piedmontese subjecthood was extended to the entirety of Italy. Inhabitants were afforded protection based upon their allegiance to the monarchy. Subjecthood was derived from an Italian father, and could only be derived maternally if the father was unknown. Birth in the territory was treated differently in different areas; in some states it conferred subjecthood, and in others it did not. Naturalization and denaturalization processes also varied depending upon the province. In 1865 laws from the various states was codified into national legislation, including a new civil code, which went into force on 1 January 1866.

Under the 1865 Civil Code, unity of the family was a driving foundation of the code, thus the emphasis was on descent. Nationality was derived paternally, regardless of where a child was born, unless the father was unknown. Foundlings born in the territory were presumed to have an Italian father and were granted nationality. Children born in Italy to foreigners who had lived in the territory for ten years, could acquire nationality at majority and those born in the territory to foreigners who did not meet the requisite residency could opt for Italian nationality at majority after service to the nation. Wives were required to follow the nationality of their husband. Italian women married to foreigners lost their Italian nationality and could only reacquire it if the marriage terminated and they established residence in Italy. Foreign women who married Italian men gained Italian nationality and retained it even after termination of the marriage. Nationality provisions were amended by Law 23 of 1901, which allowed children born in the territory or abroad who became foreigners because of a father's loss of nationality to acquire nationality without parliamentary intervention. Law no. 217 (known as Sonnino's Law), passed on 17 May 1906, allowed naturalization by royal decree if the Council of State supported the application and the applicant either resided in Italy or the colonies for six years, or had provided four years of service to the Italian state, or had been married to an Italian woman for three years.

Colonial subjecthood differed from that in the motherland. A civil code (Italian: L'ordinamento giuridico della colonia Eritrea) was drafted in 1911, for Eritrea but never officially entered in to force because it was required to be published in Amharic, Arabic, and Italian. Nonetheless, it was used as the guide and provided that persons born in or members of a tribe indigenous to the territory were Italian subjects but did not have the same civil rights as those born in Italy. If a colonial subject naturalized to attain civil rights, their status was intransmissible to other family members. Children born within a legal marriage between colonial subjects and metropolitan subjects automatically became Italian, though the majority of such unions were informal. Those children born outside of marriage, who were legitimated, or legally recognized and registered in official colonial birth records, were also automatically granted Italian nationality with full citizenship. Native women who married metropolitan Italians automatically acquired metropolitan status, but if a metropolitan woman married a native, she was able to retain her status, as it was deemed unlikely that she would be a dependent of a native man.

In 1912, Italy introduced new nationality provisions (Law No. 555) to address Italians living outside of the motherland. It did not challenge the tenet of unity of nationality in the family for metropolitan nationals, and bestowed Italian nationality by descent from an Italian father. But, if the child was born abroad in a country that automatically granted its nationality through jus soli, Italian nationality could be renounced at majority. Adding this provision allowed Italy to perpetually recognize the nationality of emigrants and foster a sense of belonging to Italy, even if expatriates chose to no longer act as citizens. For foreigners, it reduced the general residency requirement to five years, or three years if in service to the state. In 1914, to discourage marriages between colonial and metropolitan subjects, a decree was issued in Eritrea requiring civil servant to resign their posts upon marriage to a colonial. Three years later, Regent Governor in Eritrea Camillo De Camillis issued an instruction to attribute automatic metropolitan nationality to any bi-racial (Italian: meticci) child regardless of an acknowledgement of paternity.

Between 1922 and 1943, Mussolini's fascist regime expanded its territory in Africa, as well as states in the Mediterranean. Besides Eritrea, Italian territories included Ethiopia, Libya, and Somalia. A 1933 statute formalized the practice of allowing illegitimate mixed-race children to choose metropolitan status upon reaching their majority. In 1936, the territories of Ethiopia, Eritrea, and Somalia were combined into a single colony, Italian East Africa (Italian: Africa Orientale Italiana). In June, Italy began a redefinition of subjecthood for Italian East Africa. The new statute retained the provision that a colonial subject was one not descended of a metropolitan Italian or national of any other state. It also continued the policy of attributing metropolitan nationality to legitimate or legitimated children of an Italian father. But, it eliminated provisions for mixed-race children to opt for metropolitan status at majority. Further, anti-miscegenation legislation passed in 1937 prohibited concubinage and another promulgated the following year banned formal marriages between metropolitan and native subjects. Mixed marriages became illegal and were punishable with a five year sentence upon conviction. Legislation passed in 1940 barred conferring metropolitan status on mixed-race, illegitimate, legitimate, legitimated children, or children of unknown parentage, unless they had reached age thirteen that year, had been raised as an Italian, and could confirm their good character.

=== British period (1941–1951) ===
During World War II, British led forces occupied Eritrea in 1941 and established the British Military Administration. Under terms of the Hague Convention, Britain was to administer Eritrea in a manner to maintain its economic and social stability. To minimize their outlay in administration costs, the British primarily retained both Italian policy and bureaucrats. The policies they did implement were with the thought of partitioning Eritrea after the war to expand British interests and resulted in political unrest and economic instability. In 1950, the United Nations adopted a resolution that Eritrea was to be incorporated as an autonomous part of Ethiopia. Eduardo Anze Matienzo of Bolivia was selected to serve as the UN commissioner in Eritrea, implement the act to federate the nation with Ethiopia and draft a constitution after consultation with the populace. He began his consultation in May 1951, and completed the project giving Eritrea internal autonomy but subject to federal Ethiopian authority.

=== Ethiopian period (1952–1991) ===
In 1952, Imperial Order No. 6, provided that Eritrea would form part of the Federation of Ethiopia and Eritrea and that any inhabitant of its territory who did not have other nationality were conferred Ethiopian nationality. The Order also provided that persons born in Eritrea to one parent or grandparent who was Eritrean automatically became Ethiopian subjects, unless they stated a desire to retain a foreign nationality within six months of the date of the decree. Under the Ethiopian Nationality Law of 1930, in force at the time, Ethiopian subjecthood was acquired through descent from an Ethiopian parent. If legitimate or legitimized, children derived the nationality of their father. Illegitimate children could derive nationality maternally, if the father did not legitimate them. If an Ethiopian woman was legally married to a foreigner, her children could only derive her nationality by proving that they had no other nationality, as married Ethiopian women automatically lost their status and derived the husband's nationality if his country conferred nationality upon her. Foreign women who married Ethiopians, automatically acquired Ethiopian status. Naturalization could be obtained by legal adults after a five-year residency by persons who were self-supporting, were fluent in Amharic, and had no criminal record. It did not automatically apply to the wife of an applicant.

In 1962, Ethiopia formally annulled the federation and abolished the Eritrean government, leading to the Eritrean War of Independence. Under the terms of the Imperial Order incorporating Eritrea as a province, blanket nationality was conferred on all inhabitants of Eritrea, unless they had foreign nationality. In 1974, when the Ethiopian monarchy was overthrown, no new nationality law was propagated. Under Article 31 of the 1987 Constitution of the People's Democratic Republic of Ethiopia, persons who had a parent who was Ethiopian were Ethiopian. The Dergue regime, a military junta which governed Ethiopia between 1974 and 1987, was oppressive and repressive, leading to large numbers of Eritreans fleeing the country and living abroad as exiles. When they were ousted in 1991, the charter adopted to govern by the Ethiopian People's Revolutionary Democratic Front contained no nationality provisions. That same year, the Eritrean People's Liberation Front achieved de facto (unofficial) independence and expelled Ethiopians from its territory. The expulsions included government workers, military forces, and their families.

=== Post-independence (1992–present) ===
By Proclamation No. 21 January 1992, Eritrea was established as an independent state but until the 1993 referendum confirmed the creation of the new nation, inhabitants legally had dual nationality in both Ethiopia and Eritrea. Under the 1992 Nationality Proclamation, children could acquire nationality equally from either parent. Those who were granted nationality were defined as having descended from a resident of Eritrea before 1934. People who arrived in the country between 1934 and 1951 could apply for nationality and also those who arrived after 1951, even if it was more restricted for them, could apply for nationality Because of continuing uncertainty about nationality for Eritreans living in Ethiopia, in 1996, the governments of both countries proposed that to finalize the situation, people who were impacted should choose their nationality.

In 1998, the Eritrean–Ethiopian War broke out. Though border disputes and politico-economic tensions were the immediate the causes, denationalizations by both countries fueled the conflict. On 12 June 1998, large-scale deportations of Eritreans from Ethiopia began. Many of the deportees identified as Ethiopian and the rules were arbitrary. Some deportations were based on people for whom both parents were originally Eritrean, some were of children from mixed parentage, still others targeted only those with Eritrean fathers, or only those with Eritrean mothers. Ethiopia began using the rolls of voters who took part in the referendum as a basis to denationalize and expel Eritreans, but many were deported who had not taken part. Eritreans interned and deported Ethiopians residing in their territory later in the conflict. The war ended officially on 12 December 2000 when the Algiers Agreement was signed. In 2000, an independent body, Eritrea-Ethiopia Claims Commission, formed as part of the negotiated peace terms, found that as the State of Eritrea had not officially been sanctioned before the referendum, denaturalizing Ethiopians on the basis of participation in the referendum was unlawful under international law. The International Committee of the Red Cross supervised repatriations in both countries through 2002. The border demarcation was established in 2003, and though Ethiopia did not agree with the location, the peace held.

In January 2004, Ethiopia issued a directive (Directive Issued to Determine the Residence Status of Eritrean Nationals Residing in Ethiopia) on nationality for Eritreans residing in Ethiopia. Those who posed no national security risk, had lived in the country prior to the independence of Eritrea, and did not have Eritrean nationality, could opt for Ethiopian nationality or permanent residency and obtain travel documents and passports. Periodic reviews by international human rights organizations like the Committee on the Elimination of Discrimination against Women and United Nations Human Rights Council have noted that though the 1992 Nationality Proclamation granted gender equality for children and spouses to acquire nationality, the law is inadequate to protect stateless persons, specifically children born in its territory whose parents are known but have no nationality. It discriminates against persons with disabilities, and provisions for loss of nationality include arbitrary ethnicity grounds and unequal treatment of nationals by birth and those who have been naturalized.
