= Beja kingdoms =

Medieval Kingdoms

During the Middle Ages, there were six Beja kingdoms that were established. These kingdoms stretched from the lowlands of Eritrea to Aswan in Egypt. The Beja kingdoms occupied much of the former territory of the Aksum empire. These kingdoms were first noted by the famous Arab historian Al-Yaqubi during the 9th century A.D. The names of the kingdoms were Nagash, Tankish, Belgin, Bazin, Jarin and Qita'a. These kingdoms bordered each other and the powerful Nubian Alodia kingdom. To the south of the Beja kingdoms was a Christian kingdom called Najashi. Gold, precious stones and emeralds were found in many of the kingdoms. Al-Yaqubi noted that Muslim Arabs visited the kingdoms for trading purposes. He also noted that Arabs worked in the mines of the kingdoms.

The rise of the Beja tribes was one of the main reasons for the demise of the Aksumite empire in the 7th century. Raids and invasions by the Beja tribes weakened the state of the Aksum empire. Also due to the rise of Islam they lost control of their trading routes on the Red Sea coast. The Beja capitalized on this and managed to take over much of Aksum's territory. Towards the end of the 7th century A.D, a powerful Beja tribe called the Zanafaj acquired a unified structure and penetrated the Eritrean plateau through the valley of Gash-Barka and raided the Aksumites. Much of the Eritrean Highlands were overrun by Beja tribes and many of the dispersed Aksumites fled southwards. After the fall of Aksum the coastal regions were occupied by the Beja.

The Beja kingdoms were subdivided by tribes and clans. These clans were noted by Al-Yaqubi to be the Hedareb, Suhab, Amarar, Kubir, Manasa, Ras'a, Arbari'a and Zanafaj. It is also noted that the Kunama were a part of the Bazin kingdom, due the fact that they are called Bazen by Abyssinians. The Beja tribes were on good terms with Muslim Arabs that worked and visited their kingdoms. At the time that Al-Yaqubi visited the kingdoms, the Bazin kingdom was at war with the Nubian kingdom of Alodia. The Beja kingdoms were warlike and powerful nations who were skilled at warfare. There was a Beja tribe that was described as a warrior clan. The name of the clan was Dar As-Sawa. The young men of this particular tribe were sent to military training school, where they were trained for war and combat.

The inhabitants of the kingdoms that were located in Eritrea were agriculturalist and pastoralist. These kingdoms established some of the modern day cities. After 600 years, the former Beja kingdoms were replaced by the powerful Belew kingdom (also called Mezega/Bellou/Kelew) whom were also Beja (Balaw).
