= Nagash =

Nagash may refer to

- Negash, a village in northern Ethiopia, with important Muslim associations
- Stian Hinderson, a Norwegian musician known by his stage name "Nagash"
- Nagash (Warhammer) - a character in the fictional Warhammer Fantasy game setting
- Nagash painting, a form of Arabic art
- The Kingdom of Nagash, a 9th century kingdom centered in Northeast Africa
