= Demographics of Sudan =

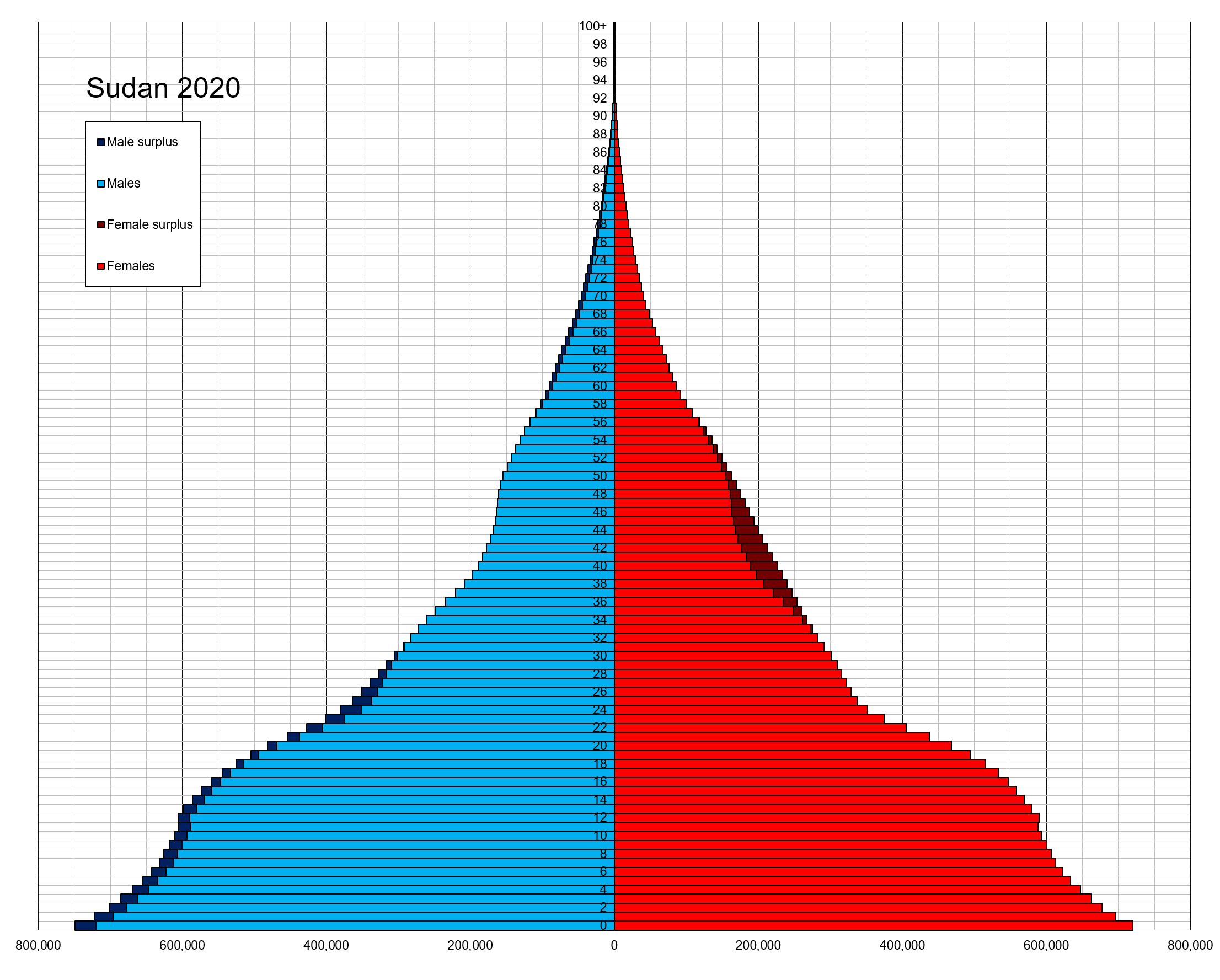
- Population pyramid of Sudan in 2020
- Population: 50,467,278 (2024 est.)
- Growth rate: 2.55% (2022 est.)
- Birth rate: 33.47 births/1,000 population (2022 est.)
- Death rate: 6.3 deaths/1,000 population (2022 est.)
- Life expectancy: 67.12 years
- Fertility rate: 4.32 children born/woman (2023 est.)
- Infant mortality: 42.27 deaths/1,000 live births
- Net migration rate: -1.67 migrant(s)/1,000 population (2022 est.)
- Immigrant share: 4.8% (2024)

Age structure
- 0–14 years: 42.01%
- 65 and over: 3.03%

Nationality
- Nationality: Sudanese
- Major ethnic: Sudanese Arabs (70.0%)
- Minor ethnic: Beja (5.9%); Nuba (2.5%); Fur (2.0%); Nubians (1.3%); Others (16.3%)

Language
- Official: Arabic and English

The demographics of Sudan include the Sudanese people (Arabic: سودانيون) and their characteristics, Sudan, including population density, ethnicity, education level, health, economic status, religious affiliations, and other aspects of the population.

Population, fertility rate and net reproduction rate, United Nations estimates

In Sudan's 1993 census, the population was calculated at 30 million. No comprehensive census has been carried out since that time due to the Second Sudanese Civil War. Estimates of Sudan, including the population of South Sudan, ranged from 37 million (United Nations) to 45 million (CIA). Since the secession of South Sudan in July 2011, the current population of Sudan is estimated to be about 46 million. The population of metropolitan Khartoum (including Khartoum, Omdurman, and Khartoum North) is growing rapidly and ranges from six to seven million, including around two million displaced persons from the southern war zone, as well as western and eastern drought-affected areas.

== Overview ==
The majority of ethnic groups of Sudan fall under Arabs, and the minority being other African ethnic groups such as the Beja, Fur, Nuba, and Fallata. When counted as one people Sudanese Arabs are by far the largest ethnic group in Sudan, however African ethnic groups are a large minority if counted as one group. They are almost entirely Muslim; while the majority speak Sudanese Arabic; some other Arab tribes speak different Arabic dialects like Awadia and Fadnia and Bani Arak tribes who speak Najdi Arabic; Bani Hassan, Al-Ashraf, Kinanah and Rashaida who speak Hejazi Arabic. In addition, Arab tribes like the Baggara and other Darfurians, both who speak Chadian Arabic. Sudanese Arabs of northern and eastern parts descend primarily from migrants from the Arabian Peninsula. Additionally, a few pre-Islamic Arabian tribes existed in Sudan from earlier migrations into the region from Western Arabia, although most Arabs in Sudan are dated from migrations after the 12th century. The vast majority of Arab tribes in Sudan migrated into the Sudan in the 12th century.

== Population size and structure ==
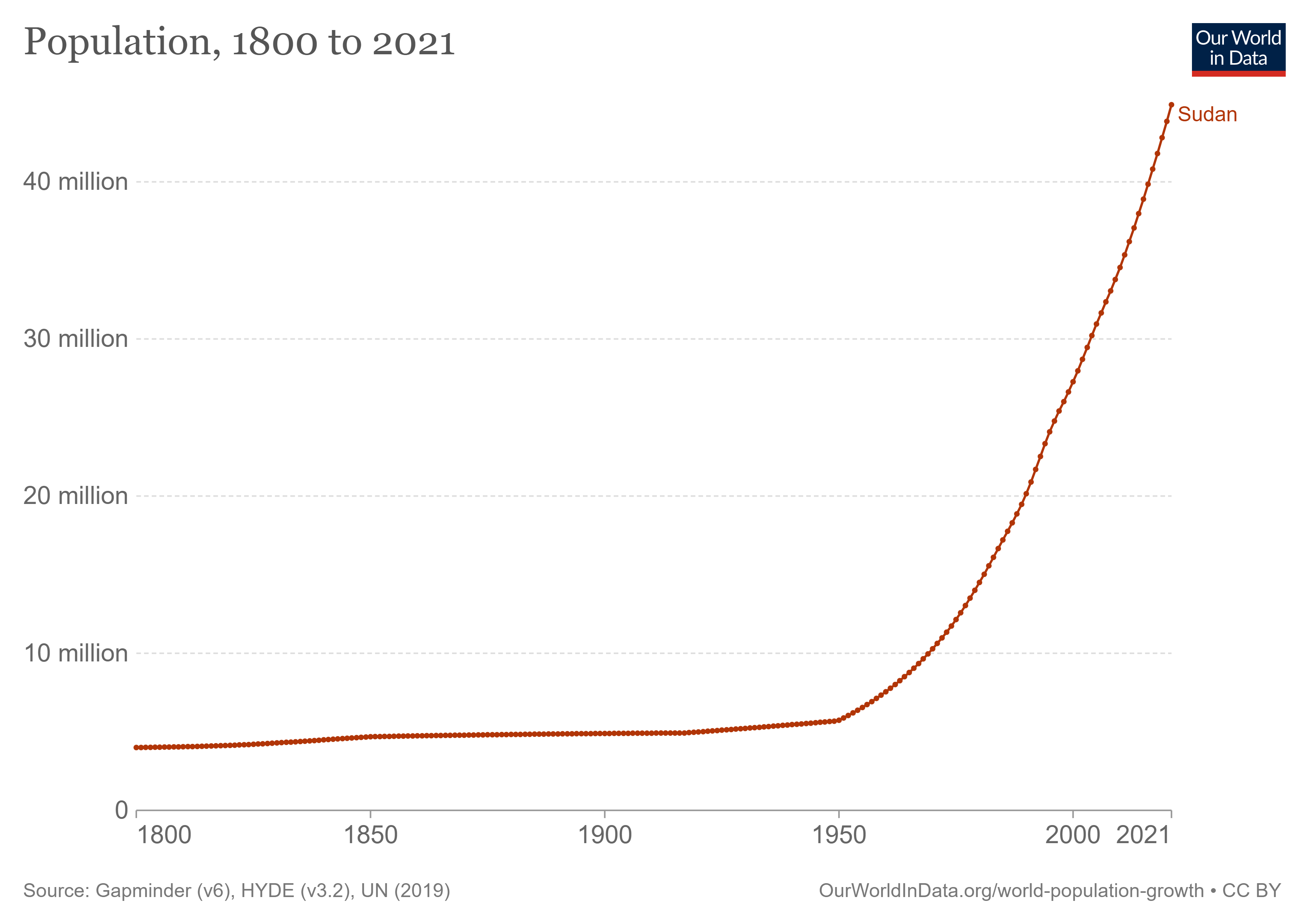
Demographics of Sudan (without South Sudan), Data of Our World in Data, year 2022; Number of inhabitants in millions.

Achieving good counts of the population is difficult in Sudan, because conducting a census has been difficult due to various conflicts and wars in the southern, eastern and western regions of Sudan over the past few decades. The government of South Sudan (led by the former SPLM resistance movement) has in the past accused Sudan of deliberately manipulating the census in oil-rich regions such as the Abyei district, on the border between Sudan and South Sudan. The population count is a determining factor for the share of wealth and power each part of Sudan receives after the secession of South Sudan (See: Naivasha Agreement). Another complication is the Southern Sudanese refugees present in the north, whose citizenship in Sudan after the secession of South Sudan is now in question. 250,000 refugees from Syria live in Sudan.

=== Age structure ===
Population Estimates by Gender and Age Group (01.VII.2016) (Unrevised data.):

Age group	Male	Female	Total	%
Total	20 105 842	19 541 779	39 647 621	100
0–4	3 506 328	3 377 853	6 884 181	17.36
5–9	2 801 266	2 677 988	5 479 254	13.82
10–14	2 325 624	2 196 472	4 522 096	11.41
15–19	2 073 006	1 952 605	4 025 611	10.15
20–24	1 816 041	1 721 450	3 537 491	8.92
25–29	1 547 613	1 519 393	3 067 006	7.74
30–34	1 295 965	1 329 629	2 625 594	6.62
35–39	1 085 101	1 136 535	2 221 636	5.60
40–44	891 195	949 131	1 840 327	4.64
45–49	732 711	762 251	1 494 962	3.77
50–54	589 400	586 304	1 175 703	2.97
55–59	458 118	441 240	899 359	2.27
60–64	340 396	314 518	654 915	1.65
65-69	248 570	225 431	474 001	1.20
70-74	170 069	152 437	322 506	0.81
75-79	109 224	97 712	206 936	0.52
80+	115 214	100 828	216 042	0.54
Age group	Male	Female	Total	Percent
0–14	8 633 218	8 252 313	16 885 531	42.59
15–64	10 829 547	10 713 058	21 542 605	54.34
65+	643 077	576 408	1 219 485	3.08

Population Estimates by Sex and Age Group (01.VII.2020) (Data refer to national projections.):

Age group	Male	Female	Total	%
Total	20 857 303	20 281 599	41 138 904	100
0–4	2 873 465	2 773 594	5 647 059	13.73
5–9	2 571 562	2 483 977	5 055 532	12.29
10–14	2 304 529	2 216 524	4 521 059	10.99
15–19	2 280 148	2 152 491	4 432 638	10.77
20–24	2 158 344	1 943 776	4 102 116	9.97
25–29	1 821 785	1 665 559	3 487 349	8.48
30–34	1 442 332	1 474 329	2 916 654	7.09
35–39	1 179 849	1 330 120	2 509 965	6.10
40–44	1 000 575	1 110 734	2 111 309	5.13
45–49	855 408	909 671	1 765 081	4.29
50–54	717 995	717 820	1 435 807	3.49
55–59	545 001	511 980	1 056 992	2.57
60–64	404 866	374 598	779 458	1.89
65-69	275 266	247 207	522 480	1.27
70-74	199 364	173 388	372 747	0.91
75-79	125 079	106 375	231 456	0.56
80+	103 574	92 332	195 909	0.48
Age group	Male	Female	Total	Percent
0–14	7 749 556	7 474 095	15 223 651	37.01
15–64	12 404 464	12 188 202	24 592 666	59.78
65+	703 283	619 302	1 322 585	3.21

== Vital statistics ==
The vital statistics below do not include South Sudan.

Year	Mid-year population	Live births	Deaths	Natural change	CBR*	CDR*	NC*	IMR*	TFR*	Life expectancy (years)
1950	6,191,000	296,000	114,000	182,000	47.8	18.4	29.4	123.7	6.69	46.77
1951	6,380,000	305,000	116,000	189,000	47.8	18.2	29.6	122.5	6.68	47.05
1952	6,574,000	314,000	118,000	197,000	47.8	17.9	29.9	120.2	6.68	47.55
1953	6,774,000	324,000	119,000	204,000	47.7	17.6	30.1	118.0	6.68	47.92
1954	6,979,000	333,000	121,000	212,000	47.7	17.4	30.4	116.3	6.69	48.26
1955	7,193,000	343,000	123,000	220,000	47.7	17.1	30.6	114.5	6.69	48.65
1956	7,414,000	353,000	127,000	226,000	47.6	17.1	30.4	113.4	6.68	48.56
1957	7,639,000	362,000	132,000	230,000	47.4	17.3	30.1	112.1	6.66	48.11
1958	7,861,000	374,000	147,000	226,000	47.5	18.7	28.8	111.6	6.67	45.81
1959	8,087,000	383,000	149,000	235,000	47.4	18.4	29.0	109.9	6.65	46.26
1960	8,326,000	394,000	151,000	244,000	47.3	18.1	29.2	108.3	6.65	46.60
1961	8,577,000	405,000	152,000	252,000	47.2	17.8	29.4	106.9	6.63	47.02
1962	8,841,000	422,000	155,000	267,000	47.7	17.5	30.2	105.4	6.69	47.35
1963	9,115,000	438,000	167,000	272,000	48.1	18.3	29.8	105.2	6.75	46.19
1964	9,407,000	456,000	153,000	303,000	48.4	16.3	32.2	102.6	6.80	49.46
1965	9,713,000	471,000	172,000	299,000	48.5	17.8	30.8	102.7	6.85	46.94
1966	10,015,000	488,000	193,000	296,000	48.7	19.2	29.5	102.8	6.90	44.63
1967	10,321,000	504,000	195,000	309,000	48.9	18.9	30.0	101.8	6.94	45.06
1968	10,639,000	518,000	198,000	320,000	48.7	18.6	30.1	100.9	6.97	45.46
1969	10,966,000	535,000	206,000	329,000	48.8	18.8	30.0	101.4	7.00	45.15
1970	11,305,000	552,000	209,000	342,000	48.8	18.5	30.3	100.7	7.03	45.53
1971	11,669,000	571,000	186,000	384,000	48.9	16.0	32.9	99.7	7.06	49.65
1972	12,057,000	583,000	189,000	394,000	48.4	15.7	32.7	97.8	7.01	49.93
1973	12,470,000	596,000	173,000	423,000	47.8	13.9	33.9	94.5	6.96	53.07
1974	12,951,000	611,000	177,000	434,000	47.4	13.7	33.6	94.0	6.95	53.23
1975	13,498,000	636,000	183,000	454,000	47.3	13.6	33.7	93.5	6.93	53.38
1976	14,066,000	662,000	189,000	473,000	47.3	13.5	33.8	93.0	6.90	53.46
1977	14,667,000	690,000	195,000	495,000	47.2	13.3	33.9	92.4	6.87	53.65
1978	15,306,000	722,000	204,000	518,000	47.4	13.4	34.0	91.8	6.84	53.44
1979	15,973,000	753,000	212,000	541,000	47.3	13.3	34.0	91.2	6.78	53.56
1980	16,674,000	785,000	217,000	568,000	47.3	13.1	34.2	90.5	6.73	53.93
1981	17,404,000	819,000	225,000	594,000	47.3	13.0	34.3	89.9	6.68	54.08
1982	18,129,000	855,000	232,000	623,000	47.3	12.8	34.4	89.3	6.64	54.32
1983	18,734,000	882,000	323,000	559,000	47.0	17.2	29.8	113.1	6.60	47.45
1984	19,166,000	893,000	345,000	548,000	46.4	17.9	28.5	114.1	6.55	46.22
1985	19,517,000	898,000	347,000	551,000	45.8	17.7	28.1	112.8	6.49	46.46
1986	19,887,000	904,000	282,000	622,000	45.2	14.1	31.1	90.5	6.43	51.48
1987	20,231,000	906,000	393,000	513,000	44.5	19.3	25.2	102.9	6.36	43.44
1988	20,454,000	909,000	532,000	377,000	44.2	25.9	18.3	118.5	6.28	35.92
1989	20,719,000	912,000	315,000	597,000	43.8	15.1	28.7	91.5	6.23	49.34
1990	21,091,000	914,000	314,000	599,000	43.1	14.8	28.3	90.0	6.17	49.73
1991	21,454,000	921,000	313,000	608,000	42.7	14.5	28.2	88.4	6.12	50.21
1992	21,780,000	925,000	377,000	548,000	42.2	17.2	25.0	94.8	6.05	45.89
1993	22,163,000	925,000	370,000	555,000	41.7	16.7	25.0	93.0	5.96	46.58
1994	22,704,000	931,000	247,000	684,000	41.0	10.9	30.1	77.0	5.87	56.64
1995	23,291,000	940,000	308,000	632,000	40.3	13.2	27.1	82.3	5.79	51.99
1996	23,862,000	949,000	309,000	640,000	39.7	12.9	26.8	80.5	5.71	52.28
1997	24,454,000	956,000	308,000	649,000	39.1	12.6	26.5	78.8	5.60	52.83
1998	25,029,000	967,000	371,000	596,000	38.6	14.8	23.8	83.1	5.50	48.81
1999	25,634,000	986,000	265,000	721,000	38.4	10.3	28.1	70.4	5.45	57.02
2000	26,299,000	1,004,000	256,000	748,000	38.1	9.7	28.4	67.4	5.38	58.32
2001	26,947,000	1,024,000	258,000	766,000	37.9	9.6	28.3	65.3	5.33	58.56
2002	27,570,000	1,035,000	258,000	777,000	37.4	9.3	28.1	63.3	5.25	58.98
2003	28,189,000	1,044,000	274,000	770,000	36.9	9.7	27.3	63.1	5.17	58.20
2004	28,832,000	1,049,000	298,000	751,000	36.3	10.3	26.0	63.7	5.09	56.77
2005	29,541,000	1,062,000	297,000	764,000	35.9	10.1	25.9	62.2	5.04	57.28
2006	30,333,000	1,108,000	264,000	844,000	36.5	8.7	27.8	57.5	5.04	60.28
2007	31,191,000	1,159,000	260,000	899,000	37.1	8.3	28.8	55.3	5.07	61.26
2008	32,065,000	1,204,000	269,000	935,000	37.5	8.4	29.1	54.5	5.07	61.21
2009	32,948,000	1,239,000	257,000	982,000	37.6	7.8	29.8	52.0	5.05	62.64
2010	33,740,000	1,272,000	259,000	1,012,000	37.5	7.6	29.8	50.7	5.02	63.02
2011	34,420,000	1,277,000	261,000	1,016,000	36.9	7.5	29.4	49.6	4.96	63.25
2012	35,160,000	1,281,000	258,000	1,023,000	36.3	7.3	29.0	48.5	4.90	63.79
2013	35,991,000	1,311,000	266,000	1,046,000	36.3	7.4	29.0	47.5	4.90	63.68
2014	37,003,000	1,344,000	264,000	1,080,000	36.3	7.1	29.2	46.4	4.91	64.27
2015	38,171,000	1,390,000	268,000	1,122,000	36.4	7.0	29.4	45.3	4.90	64.66
2016	39,377,000	1,418,000	274,000	1,143,000	36.0	7.0	29.1	44.2	4.83	64.78
2017	40,680,000	1,448,000	273,000	1,175,000	35.7	6.7	28.9	43.1	4.76	65.45
2018	41,999,000	1,479,000	279,000	1,200,000	35.2	6.6	28.6	42.0	4.68	65.68
2019	45,548,000	1,590,000	298,000	1,292,000	34.9	6.5	28.4	40.2	4.62	65.8
2020	46,789,000	1,613,000	317,000	1,296,000	34.5	6.8	27.7	39.1	4.54	65.1
2021	48,067,000	1,630,000	366,000	1,294,000	33.9	7.0	26.9	38.1	4.46	64.5
2022	49,383,000	1,656,000	322,000	1,334,000	33.5	6.5	27.0	37.1	4.38	65.7
2023	50,043,000	1,682,000	320,000	1,362,000	33.6	6.4	27.2	36.2	4.32	66.3
* CBR = crude birth rate (per 1000); CDR = crude death rate (per 1000); NC = natural change (per 1000); IMR = infant mortality rate per 1000 births; TFR = total fertility rate (number of children per woman)

View source data.
View source data.
View source data.
View source data.

== Ethnic groups ==
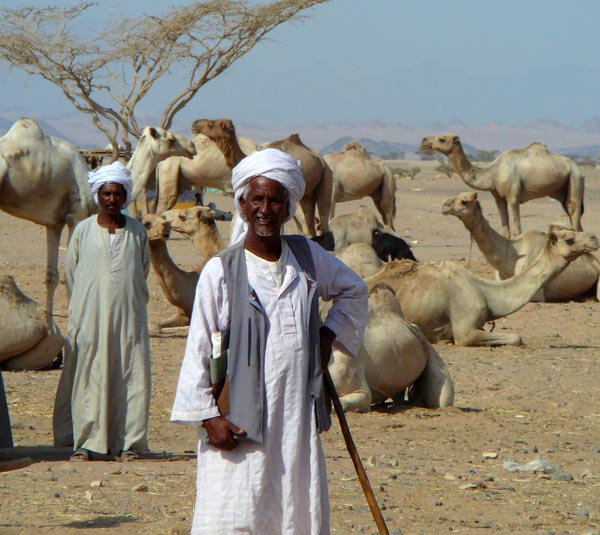
Beja nomads

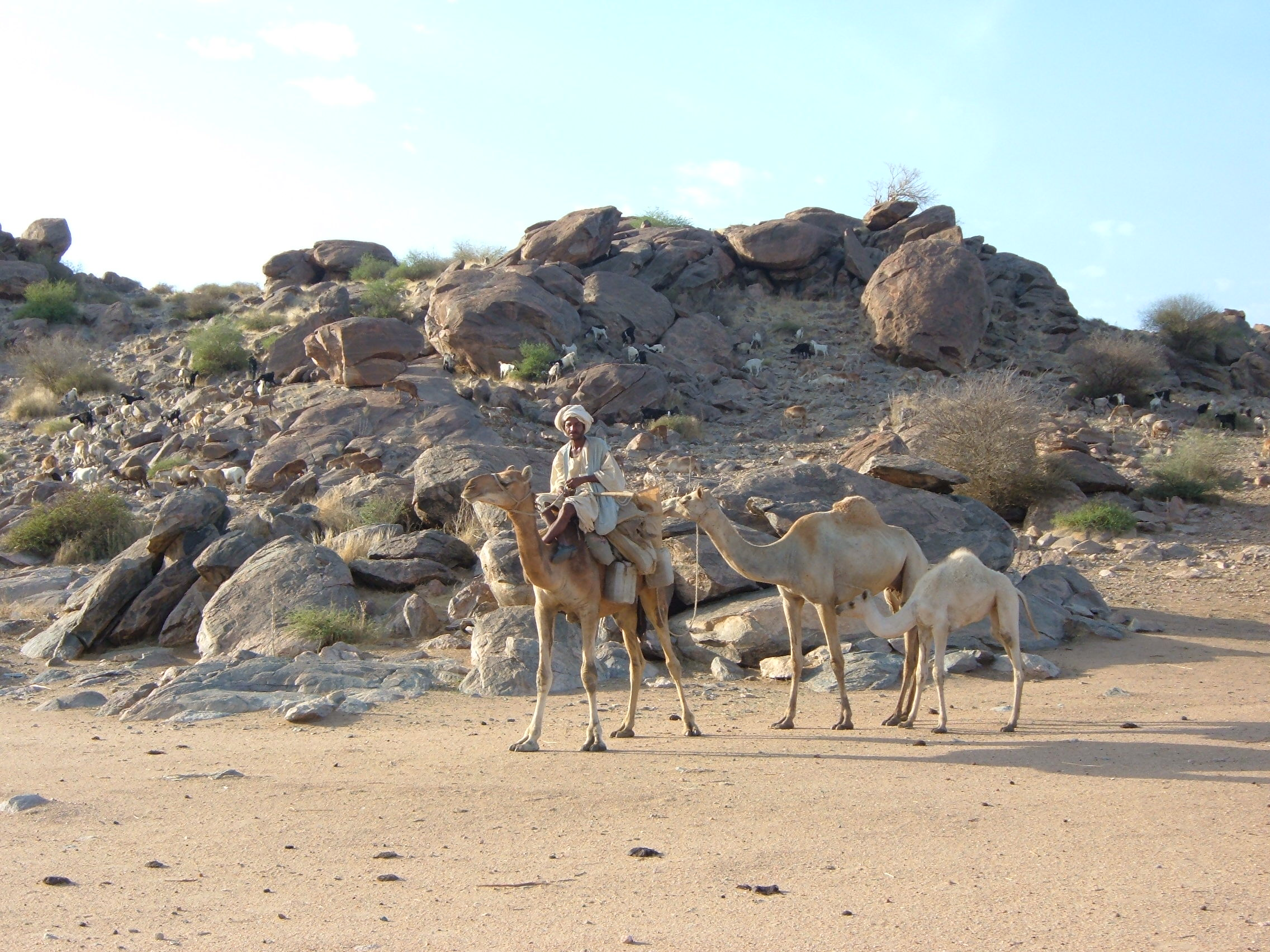
Arab Bedouin in north

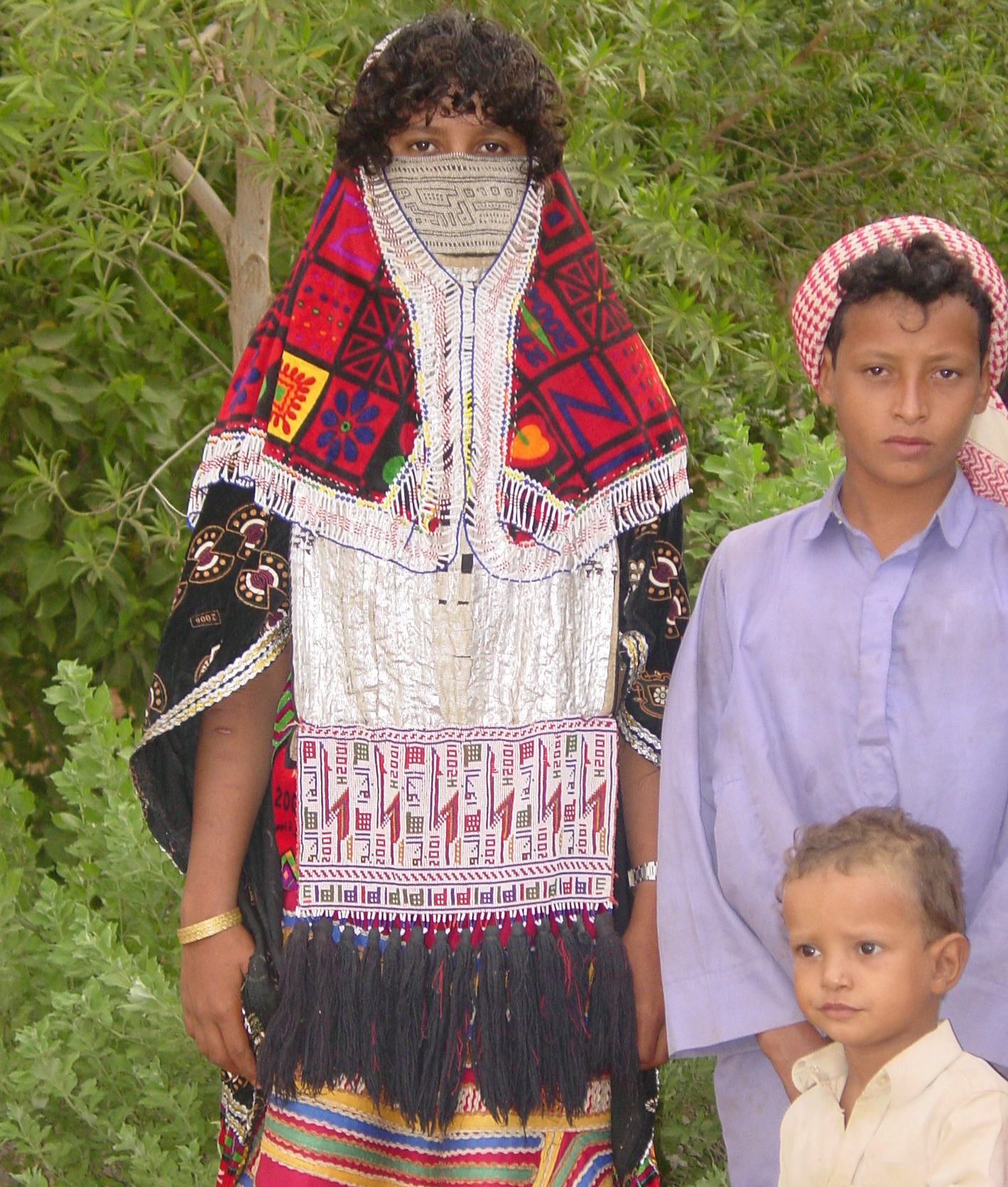
Rashaida in the east

Sudan is a country characterized by its cultural and ethnic diversity. Various ethnic groups contribute to the rich tapestry of Sudanese society. The major ethnic groups in Sudan include Sudanese Arabs, Nubians, Zaghawa, and Beja, among others.

Sudanese Arabs form the largest ethnic group in Sudan, comprising approximately 70% of the population. They are predominantly Muslim and speak Arabic. Nubians, another significant ethnic group, have their origins in the Nubia region along the Nile River. They have a distinct cultural heritage and are known for their architectural achievements.

The Zaghawa, also known as Beri or Gimi, are an ethnic group with a presence in Sudan, Chad, and other neighboring countries. They have a pastoralist lifestyle and are known for their cattle herding and camel breeding skills.

Additionally, Sudan is home to diverse ethnic groups such as the Fur, Beja, Nuba, Fula, Nubian people, and a small community of Domari people known by outside groups as "Gypsies". These groups have unique cultural expressions, languages, social structures, and religious practices, contributing to the cultural mosaic of Sudan.

Sudan's demographics have undergone changes, particularly with the secession of South Sudan in 2011. South Sudan was home to many sub-Saharan African ethnic groups. As a result, Sudan's ethnic landscape has evolved, and South Sudan became an independent nation.

The 1956 census of Sudan, the only census to collect information on ethnic identity, found 39% of the population identified as Arab, 30% as one of the southern ethnic groups, 13% as one of the western ethnic groups, 6% as Beja, 6% as Nuba, 3% as Nubian, and 3% as foreigners/other. North Sudan and South Sudan were still one country at the time of the census.

== Languages ==
The most widely spoken languages in Sudan are:

1. Arabic language:
  1. Sudanese Arabic.
  2. Najdi and Hejazi Arabic, (mainly in mid-north and mid-east regions).
  3. Chadian Arabic in western region, (mainly spoken by Baggara and various Arabized African tribes).
2. Nubian language in far north, (mainly spoken by Nubians of Mahas, Dongola and Halfa).
3. Beja language known as Bedawit in far east alongside Red sea, (mainly spoken by the Beja people, mainly the Hadandawa, Ababda and Bisharin).

Before 2005, only Arabic was the official language. In the 2005 constitution, Sudan's official languages became Arabic and English:

Article 8:

1. All indigenous languages of Sudan are national languages and shall be respected, developed and promoted.
2. Arabic is a widely spoken national language in Sudan.
3. Arabic, as a major language at the national level and English shall be the official working languages of the national government and the languages of instruction for higher education.
4. In addition to Arabic and English, the legislature of any sub-national level of government may adopt any other national language as an additional official working language at its level.
5. There shall be no discrimination against the use of either Arabic or English at any level of government or stage of education.

The working constitution of the post-2019 Revolution transitional period specifies no national language.

== Religion ==
Religion in Sudan
religion	percent
Islam	97%
African Traditional Religion	1.5%
Christianity	1.5%

In Sudan, 97% of the population adheres to Islam, with the overwhelming majority being adherents of the Sunni branch and the Maliki school of Islamic jurisprudence. The remainder of the population follows either animist and indigenous beliefs or Christianity, especially in Khartoum and in southern regions of the country bordering South Sudan.

Christians in Sudan who are refugees or immigrants from the south belong to various churches including the Roman Catholic Church, small Melkite and Maronite communities in the north, as well as Anglicans followers in the Episcopal Church of Sudan and the recently formed Reformed Episcopal Church. There are significant but long-established groups of Coptic Orthodox and Greek Orthodox Christians in Khartoum and other northern cities.

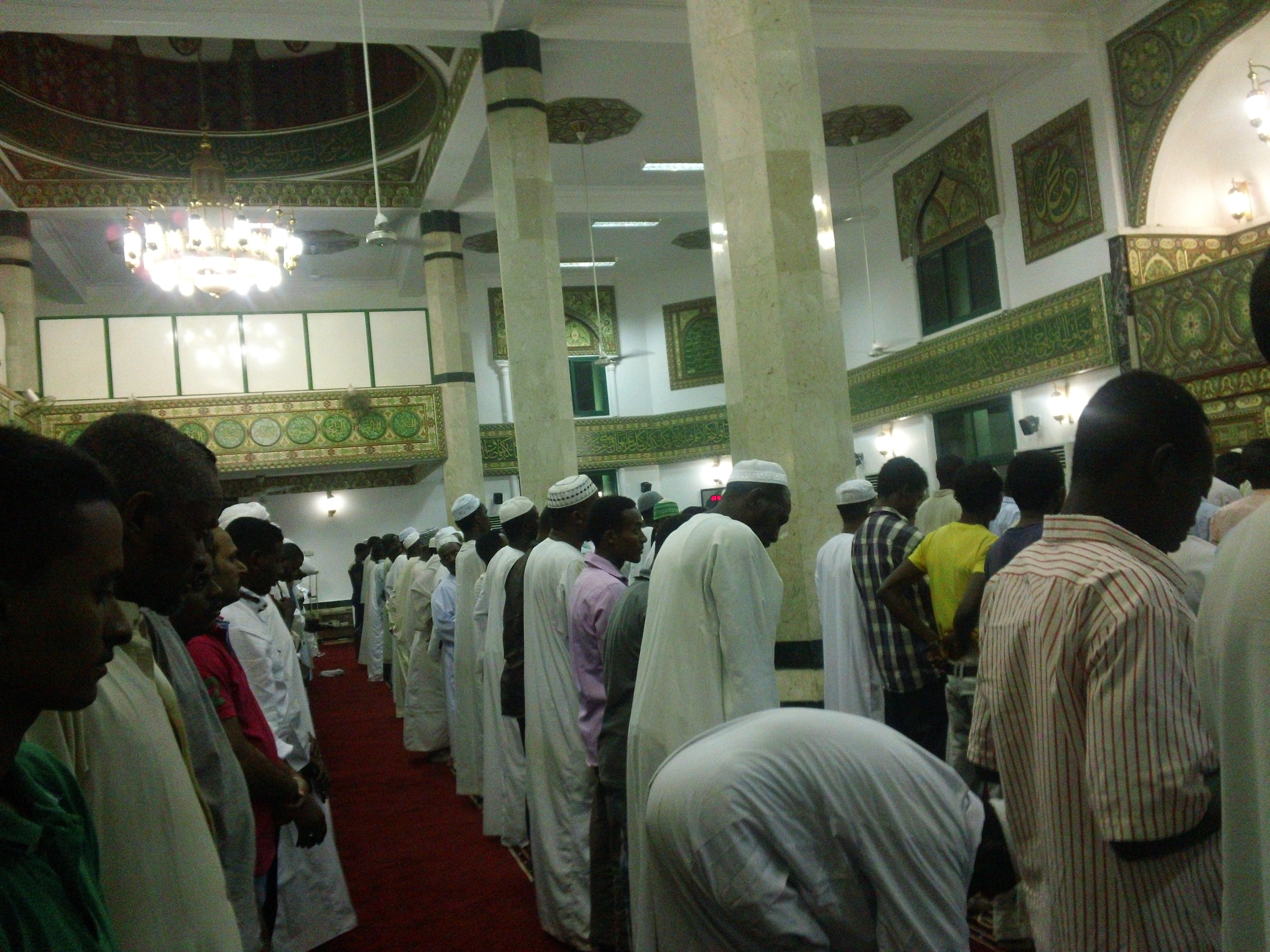
Men praying at the Sidah Sanhory Mosque, in Khartoum

There are also Ethiopian and Eritrean Orthodox communities in Khartoum and eastern Sudan, largely made up of refugees and migrants from the past few decades. Other Christian groups with smaller followings in the country include the Africa Inland Church, the Armenian Apostolic Church, the Sudan Church of Christ, the Sudan Interior Church, Jehovah's Witnesses, the Sudan Pentecostal Church, the Sudan Evangelical Presbyterian Church (in the North).

Religious identity plays a role in the country's political divisions. Northern and western Muslims have dominated the country's political and economic system since independence. The NCP draws much of its support from Islamists, Salafis/Wahhabis and other conservative Arab Muslims in the north. The Umma Party has traditionally attracted Arab followers of the Ansar sect of Sufism as well as non-Arab Muslims from Darfur and Kordofan.

The Democratic Unionist Party (DUP) includes both Arab and non-Arab Muslims in the north and east, especially those in the Khatmia Sufi sect.

== Migration ==
=== Emigration ===
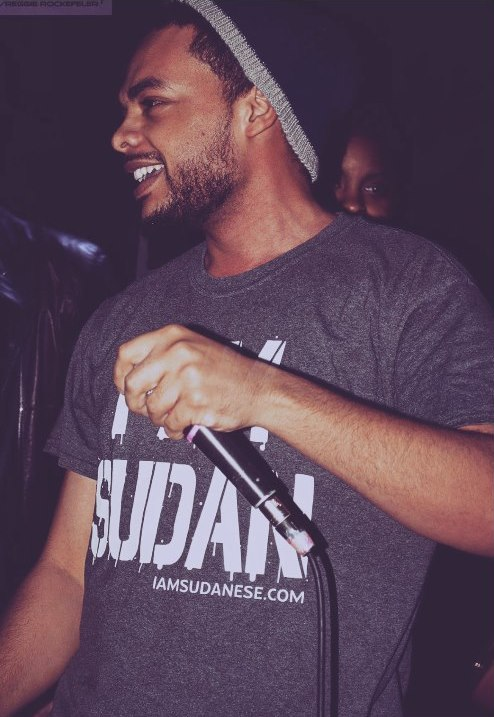
American-Sudanese rap musician Ramey Dawoud is part of the Sudanese diaspora
