= Gawamaa =

Gawamaa or Gawam'a is a Sudanese Arab tribe. They are a large sedentary Arab clan in North Kordofan

The number of its members is about 750,000. The members of this group speak Sudanese Arabic. All members of this group are Muslims.
