= Ali Baba (Beja chief) =

North African monarch

Alibaba
- Reign: c.854
- Born: 9th century
- Died: After 854

Ali Baba (c. 854) was the Arabic name for a ruler of the Beja people in the ninth century who came into conflict with the Abbasid Caliphate in the 850s.
