= Ambigol =

Ambigol أمبيجول
- Location within Sudan
- Coordinates: 21°16′0″N 30°55′0″E
- Country: Sudan

Ambigol (Arabic: أمبيجول), also known Ambikol, Ambikul, and Umbacall, was a 19th-century settlement on the Nile River in Sudan. Prior to the construction of the Aswan High Dam and Lake Nubia, it was the site of a minor cataract between the Second and Third major ones. It was part of the Hawawir lands.
