= Sudanese Arabs =

Majority population of Sudan

عرب سودانيون
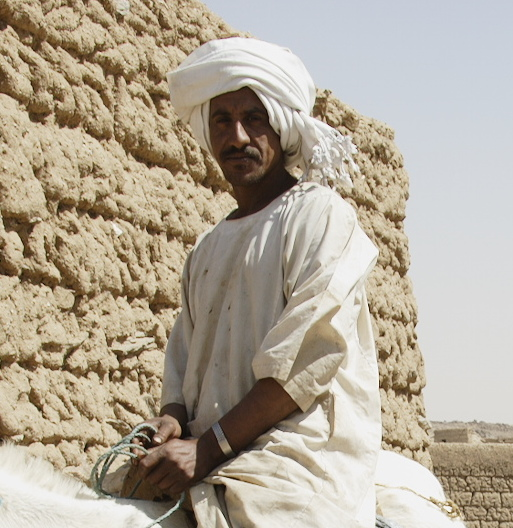
- Sudanese Arab from the tribe of Manasir

Total population
- ~35 million (70% of the population)

Languages
- Sudanese Arabic

Religion
- Sunni Islam

Related ethnic groups
- Arabs, Nubians, Beja, Cushites, Nilo-Saharans

Sudanese Arabs (Arabic: عرب سودانيون, romanized: ʿarab sūdāniyyūn) are the inhabitants of Sudan who identify as Arabs and speak Arabic as their mother tongue. Sudanese Arabs make up 70% of the population of Sudan; however, prior to the independence of South Sudan in 2011, Sudanese Arabs made up 40% of the population. They are Sunni Muslims and speak Sudanese Arabic.

== History ==
The Sudanese Arab ethnic group finds its origins in the centuries-long admixture of indigenous African populations with Arab immigrants as well as from cultural and linguistic shifts to an Arab identity, culture, and language leading to a unique cultural identity. Prior to Arabization, Sudan was mainly inhabited by Cushitic-speaking groups like the Beja and Nilo-Saharan peoples such as the Nubians, whose civilizations, including the ancient kingdoms of Kush and Meroe, left their mark on the region's early history. Particularly famous is the developmentally high architectural, artistic, and political achievements of the Nubians along the Nile.

The transformation toward an Arab identity accelerated with the arrival of Arab tribes during the 15th–19th centuries. These tribes, such as the Juhaynah and Rufa'a, brought Islam and the Arabic language, which became widely spread across Sudan. This interaction was characterized by marriage, trade, and assimilation of the indigenous people into Arab-Islamic culture. The Arabic language became the primary medium of communication and a symbol of social and religious prestige that contributed to cultural change.

This Arabization was not, however, uniformly experienced. Whereas the northern and central regions became identified with Arabism, the southern and western parts of the Sudan retained very distinct languages, traditions, and religions, more often than not resisting assimilation. This complex ethnic and cultural history informs the Sudanese Arab group today, which is the single largest ethnic bloc and enjoys the greatest influence over political, social, and cultural development in the country.

Slavery and the slave trade also shaped social and racial hierarchies in Sudan. In northern Sudan, being Arab was linked to being Muslim, free and of high standing, while the term Sudanese was associated with blackness and, through the legacy of slavery, with servile status. By the late 18th century, southerners were being referred to with the term ʿabd ("slave"), while communities in the south, the Upper Blue Nile and the Nuba Mountains were treated as populations that could be enslaved. These associations between Arab identity, blackness and slavery have remained closely connected to racism in Sudan.

== Regional variation ==
Arab tribes arrived in Sudan in three main waves, beginning with the Ja'alin in the 12th century. The Ja'alin trace their lineage to Abbas ibn Abd al-Muttalib and their culture was closely linked with that of the Bedouin in Arabia. The second main wave was the migration of the Juhaynah before the 17th century in two main subgroups, the Baggara and Kabbabish. The final main wave was the migration of Bani Rashid in the mid-19th century.

The great majority of the Sudanese Arabs tribes are part of larger tribal confederations: the Ja'alin, who primarily live along the Nile river basin between Khartoum and Abu Hamad; the Shaigiya, who live along the Nile between Korti and Jabal al-Dajer, and parts of the Bayuda Desert; the Juhaynah, who live east and west of the Nile, and include the Rufaa people, the Shukria clan and the Kababish; the Banu Fazara or Fezara people who live in Northern Kordofan; the Kawahla, who inhabit eastern Sudan, Northern Kordofan, and White Nile State; and the Baggara, who inhabit South Kordofan and extend to Lake Chad. There are numerous smaller tribal units that do not conform to the above groups, such as the Messelemiya, the Rikabia, the Hawawir people, the Magharba, the Awadia and Fadnia tribes, the Kerriat, the Kenana people, the Kerrarish, the Hamran, amongst others.

Sudan also houses non-Sudanese Arab populations such as the Rashaida that only recently settled in Sudan in 1846, after migrating from the Hejaz region of the Arabian Peninsula. Additionally, other smaller Sudanese groups who have also been Arabized, or partially Arabized, but retain a separate, non-Arab identity, include the Nubians, Copts, and Beja. Most Sudanese Arabs speak modern Sudanese Arabic, with western Sudanese tribes bordering Chad, like the Darfurians, generally speaking Chadian Arabic. Sudanese Arabs have large variations in culture and genealogy because of their descent from a combination of various population groups. Other Arab populations in Sudan that are not Sudanese Arab, (i.e. those that are recent arrivals to the region exist), most of them such as the Awadia and Fadnia tribes, the Bani Hassan, Al-Ashraf and Rashaida tribes generally speak Hejazi Arabic instead of the more widespread Sudanese Arabic.

== Sudanese Arabic ==
The variety of Arabic spoken by Sudanese Arabs has evolved from the varieties of Arabic brought by Arabs who migrated to the region after the signing of the Treaty of Baqt, a 7th-century treaty between the Muslim rulers of Egypt and the Nubian kingdom of Makuria. Testimonies by travelers to the areas that would become modern-day Sudan, like Ibn Battuta, indicate that Arabic coexisted alongside indigenous Sudanese languages, with multilingualism in Arabic and non-Arabic Sudanese languages being well attested by travelers to the region up until the 19th century. Sudanese Arabic has characteristics similar to Egyptian Arabic. As a point of difference, though, the Sudanese dialect retains some archaic pronunciation patterns, such as the letter ج, and it also exhibits characteristics of the ancient Nobiin language that once covered the region. Accordingly, linguists have identified a variety of influences from Nubian, Beja, Fur, Nilotic, and other Sudanese languages on the vocabulary and phonology of Sudanese Arabic.

Sudanese Arabic is highly diverse. Famed Sudanese linguist Awn ash-Sharif Gasim noted that "it is difficult to speak of a 'Sudanese colloquial language' in general, simply because there is not a single dialect used simultaneously in all the regions where Arabic is the mother tongue. Every region, and almost every tribe, has its own brand of Arabic." However, Gasim broadly distinguishes between the varieties spoken by sedentary groups along the Nile (such as the Ja'aliyyin) and pastoralist groups (such as the Baggara groups of west Sudan). The most widely-spoken variety of Sudanese is variably referred to as Central Sudanese Arabic, Central Urban Sudanese Arabic, or Khartoum Arabic, which more closely resembles varieties spoken by sedentary groups.

In 1889, the Journal of the Royal Anthropological Institute of Great Britain claimed that the Arabic spoken in Sudan was "a pure but archaic Arabic". The pronunciation of certain letters was like Hijazi, and not Egyptian, such as g being the pronunciation for the Arabic letter Qāf and J being the pronunciation for Jeem.

== Genetics ==
In 2007, the mtDNA haplotype diversity for 102 individuals in Northern Sudan was analysed. The haplogroup distribution was 22.5% of Eurasian ancestry, 4.9% of the East African M1 lineage, and 72.5% of sub-Saharan affiliation.

According to Y-DNA analysis by Hassan et al. (2008), among Sudanese Arabs, 67% of Arakien, 43% of Messiria, and 40% of Ja'alin individuals carry the Haplogroup J. The remainder mainly belong to the E1b1b clade, which is borne by 18% of Ja'aliyeen, 17% of Arakien, and 14% of Messiria. The next most frequently observed haplogroups among Sudanese Arabs are the European-associated R1 clade (25% Messiria, 16% Ja'alin, 8% Arakien), followed by the Eurasian lineage F (11% Messiria, 10% Ja'alin, 8% Arakien), the Europe-associated I clade (7% Messiria, 4% Ja'alin), and the African A3b2 haplogroup (6% Ja'alin).

Maternally, Hassan (2009) observed that over 90% of the Sudanese Arabs samples carried various subclades of the Macrohaplogroup L. Of these mtDNA lineages, the most frequently borne clade was L3 (68% Ja'alin, 40% Messiria, 24% Arakien), followed by the L2 (53% Arakien, 33% Messiria, 9% Ja'alin), L0a1 (13% Messiria), L1 (7% Messiria, 5% Ja'alin), and L5 (9% Ja'alin, 6% Arakien) haplogroups. The remaining ~10% of Sudanese Arabs belonged to sublineages of the Eurasian macrohaplogroup N (Arakien: 6% preHV1, 6% N1a, 6% N/J1b; Ja'alin: 9% preHV1; Messiria: 7% N/J1b).

Dobon et al. (2015) identified an ancestral autosomal component of West Eurasian origin that is common to many modern Sudanese Arabs (as well as other Northern Sudanese populations). Known as the Coptic component, it peaks among Egyptian Copts who settled in Sudan over the past two centuries. The scientists associate the Coptic component with Ancient Egyptian ancestry, without the later Arabian influence that is present among other Egyptians.

Hollfelder et al. (2017) analysed various populations in Sudan, and observed Sudanese Arabs showed signs of also having younger admixture dates, from the fall of Dongola in 1315-1316 AD. With the authors noting:

The Eurasian admixture proportion in the Arab populations is high, ranging between ~40%–48%. The presence of a northeast African genetic signature similar to Nilotic populations and the recent admixture signal from Eurasia indicates that the populations in central Sudan that self-identify as Arab were originally a local northeast African population (similar to the Nubians and the Beja) that mixed with a Eurasian population during the Arab expansion, or possibly earlier. However, the mixed groups kept the language and culture of the incoming migrants.
