= Hawawir people =

Africian ethnic group of Semitic origin

The Hawawir are a Sudanese Arab tribe dwelling in the Bayuda Desert, Sudan. They are found along the road from Debba to Khartoum as far as Bir Gamr, and from Ambigol to Wadi Bishhra as well as El Obeid.

They adopted none of the African customs, such as gashing the cheeks or elaborate hairdressing. They owned large herds of camels, sheep. Members of the tribe include the 19th century judge and Islamic scholar Arabi Ahmed Al-Hawwari who founded the Grand Mosque of El-Obeid and was mentioned in the Letters of Ahmad ibn Idris as an Islamic scholar, judge, and friend of the sheikh as well as a close companion and student of Mohammed Uthman al-Mirghani al-Khatim.
