= Rufa'a people =

Ethnic group in Sudan

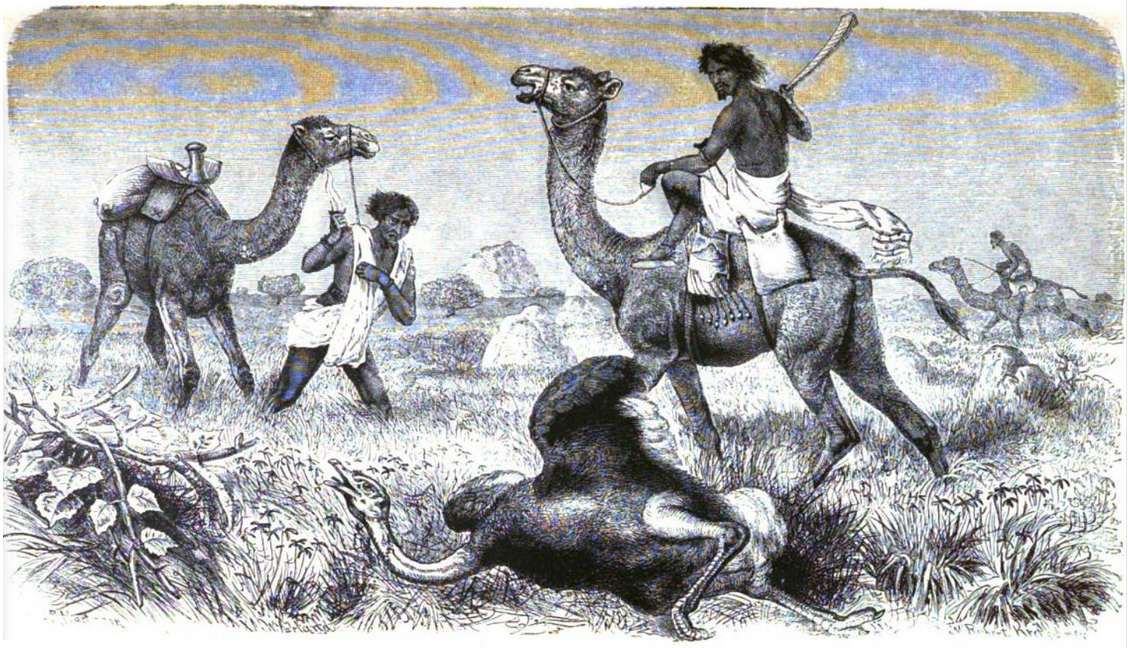
Three Rufaa hunt an ostrich, c. 1870

Rufa'a, also known as Rufa'a Al-Hayy (also spelled Rufa'a Al-Hoi and Rufa a al-Hoj), are an Arab tribe in Sudan located in Gezira. They speak Sudanese Arabic. Most members from this ethnic group are Sunni Muslims.

Traditionally, Rufa'a al Hoi were pastoral. Leaders were chosen based on heredity.

Rufaa al Hawa nomads had violent clashes with farmers after returning from Southern Sudan to Sennar State in 2016 and demanding resettlement.

== Notable people ==
Abdel Rahman Albishi
