= Kingdom of Tankish =

The Kingdom of Tankish was an early medieval kingdom centered in Northeast Africa. According to Al-Yaqubi, it was one of six Beja polities that existed in the region during the 9th century. The kingdom's territory was located between Aswan and Massawa.

== See also ==
- Sultanate of Shewa
- Sultanate of Ifat
- Adal Sultanate
- Kingdom of Bazin
- Kingdom of Belgin
- Kingdom of Jarin
- Kingdom of Nagash
- Kingdom of Qita'a
