= Kingdom of Jarin =

The Kingdom of Jarin was an early medieval kingdom centered in Northeast Africa. According to Al-Yaqubi, it was one of six Beja kingdoms that existed in the region during the 9th century. The kingdom's territory was located between Gash-Barka and Massawa. The king of Jarin rule extended from Massawa on the Red Sea coast, to the frontier of Gash-Barka having borders with the Baqlin kingdom.It was one of the six Beja kingdoms noted by Al-Yaqubi.

== History ==
During the Middle Ages there were five Beja kingdoms established. These kingdoms stretched from Eritrea to Aswan in Egypt. The Beja kingdoms occupied much of the former territory of the Axum empire. These kingdoms were first noted by the famous Arab historian Al-Yaqubi during the 9th century A.D. The names of the kingdoms were Naqis, Baqlin, Bazin, Erin, Bus 100 and Qat'a. The kingdoms had borders with each other and the Nubian kingdom Alodia. To the south of the Beja kingdoms was a Christian kingdom referred to as Najashi. Gold, precious stones and emeralds were found in many of the kingdoms. Al-Yaqubi noted that Muslim Arabs visited the kingdoms for trading purposes. He also noted that the Arabs worked in the state mines. The primary commercial activities of the Beja kingdoms were mining and slave trade. An important slave-trade center was established on the Dahlak islands. Slaves were traded out of the African interior to the Arabian peninsula and beyond. Amid Beja rule, most of the descendants of the Axum empire were either driven out of the region or sold as slaves.

Cities within the Kingdom of Jarin's territory included Suakin and ‘Aydhab. However, both towns were independent of the polity and were also under the protection of Egypt.

== See also ==
- Sultanate of Ifat
- Adal Sultanate
- Kingdom of Bazin
- Kingdom of Belgin
- Kingdom of Nagash
- Kingdom of Qita'a
- Kingdom of Tankish
