= Fezara people =

Fezara is an ethnic group of Sudan, who emigrated from Arabia to Egypt, and then to Sudan. The number of persons in this ethnic group is about 200,000. Most members of this ethnic group are Muslims. This ethnic group speaks Sudanese Arabic.
