= Kingdom of Bazin =

The Kingdom of Bazin was an early medieval kingdom centered in Northeast Africa. According to Al-Yaqubi, it was one of six Beja polities that existed in the region during the 9th century. The kingdom's territory was located between Aswan and Massawa.

Most of the population were the native Kunama people, called "Bazin" (or sometimes Baden, Bazen etc.), who practiced a traditional religion. The Bazin people were under the protection of the Abyssinian Empire. This was made clear in the so-called Ezana Stone, wherein an unnamed Aksumite Emperor is said to have defended the Bazin from invading Noba. With the collapse of the Kingdom of Aksum in the year 960 CE, Beja clans invaded and established several kingdoms in present-day Eritrea, including Bazin.

== See also ==
- Sultanate of Ifat
- Adal Sultanate
- Kingdom of Belgin
- Kingdom of Jarin
- Kingdom of Nagash
- Kingdom of Qita'a
- Kingdom of Tankish
