= Rauso =

Rauso was a region in the Horn of Africa in Late Antiquity.

== Geography ==
The Monumentum Adulitanum is a 4th-century monumental inscription by King Ezana of Axum recording his various victories in war. It is lost, but its text was copied down in the 6th century by Cosmas Indicopleustes in his Christian Topography. It describes how Ezana conquered a land and people called Rauso to the west of Aromata. The description of the land is congruous with modern-day Dollo Zone and Haud. also translated "Land of Incense" or "frankincense country":

I subjugated the peoples of Rauso who live in the midst of incense-gathering barbarians between great waterless plains.

British Anglican priest William Vincent described the region of Rauso as stretching westwards from Aromata all the way to the hinterlands of the hitherto prospective Adal Kingdom. During its extant existence, the contemporary polity to the north of Rauso was Sesea. The region of Rauso could also be congruous with the Nugaal plains of northern Somalia. Laurence P. Kirwan identified it with the Danakil Desert, inhabited today by the Afar.

== Politics ==
English journalist Frederick Guest Tomlins described Rauso as a Kingdom. Rauso also had an alternative toponym by the epithet of Raitnus. It used to exchange ordained religious ministers with the northern polities. A predominant religion practised during the Rauso period was Waaqism. During the classical era, through its contact with Hadhramaut and Himyarite traders, the Rauso kingdom had contact with Abrahamic religions too, in the form of Christianity in the former and Judaism in the latter, and some of these populations had settled and became Somalized. The pre-Rauso era is largely regarded as corresponding with Lowland East Cushite history.

It was bordered to the south by various Horner and cushitic tribal groupings such as the Northern Azanians, the Ormas, the Bazrangids, the Tunni, Gabooye and various other Lowland East Cushites. Sometime during the latter half of the 1st millennium, Rauso was replaced by the Jabarta and Ximan civilizations. Concurrently, there also existed a predominantly Christian civilization called Harli towards the north in the Nugaal Valley.
