= Kingdom of Belgin =

Early medieval Kingdom centered in Northeast Africa during the 9th century

The Kingdom of Belgin, also known as the Kingdom of Baqulin, was an early medieval kingdom centered in Northeast Africa. According to Al-Yaqubi, it was one of six Beja polities in the region during the 9th century. The kingdom's territory was located between Aswan and Massawa. They followed a dualistic religion, with the Supreme Zabjir as good, and Saha Haraqa as evil. Yaqubi claimed that they plucked their facial hair, practiced circumcision, and removed their incisors, and that Belgin was a rainy place. Some historians have suggested that "Az-Zabjir" may be actually be the Ethiopic term "Egzi’aheher", a title for Jesus Christ.

== See also ==
- Sultanate of Ifat
- Adal Sultanate
- Kingdom of Bazin
- Kingdom of Jarin
- Kingdom of Nagash
- Kingdom of Qita'a
- Kingdom of Tankish
