= Awadia and Fadnia tribes =

Awadia and Fadnia are two small nomad tribes of pure Arab descent living in the Bayuda Desert, Sudan, between the wells of Jakdul and Metemma. They are often incorrectly classed as Ja'alin. They own numbers of horses and cattle, the former of the black Dongola breed. At the battle of Abu Klea (17 January 1885) they were conspicuous for their courage in riding against the British square.
