= Beja people =

Cushitic ethnic group native to Egypt, Sudan and Eritrea

Beja
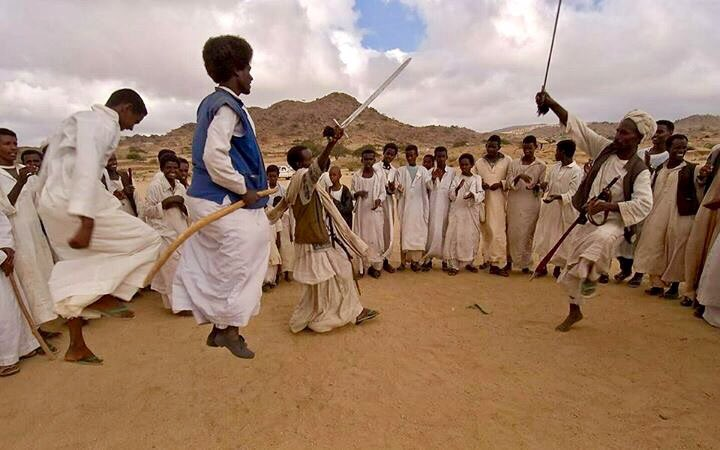
- Beja men dancing

Total population
- 1.9–3 million

Regions with significant populations
- Eastern Desert
- Sudan: 2,620,000 (2024)
- Eritrea: 121,000 (2022)
- Egypt: 88,000 (2023)

Languages
- Sudanese Arabic, Beja, Tigre

Religion
- Sunni Islam

Related ethnic groups
- Cushites, Eritreans, Ethiopians, Somalis, Sudanese Arabs, Nubians, Tigre

The Beja people (Note: Arabic: البجا, Beja: Oobja, Tigre: በጃ) or the Bejas are a Cushitic ethnic group native to the Eastern Desert, inhabiting a coastal area from southeastern Egypt through eastern Sudan and into northwestern Eritrea. They are descended from peoples who have inhabited the area since 4000 BC or earlier. They are nomadic and live primarily in the Eastern Desert. The Beja number from 1.9 million to 3 million.

Some of the Beja speak a Cushitic language called Beja and some speak Tigre, a Semitic language, while others speak Arabic. In Eritrea and southeastern Sudan, many members of the Beni-Amer grouping speak Tigre. In southeastern Egypt and northeastern Sudan most Ababda speak Arabic. Originally, the Beja did not speak Arabic, but the migration of the numerous Arab tribes of Juhaynah, Mudar, Rabi'a, and many more to the Beja areas contributed to the Arabization and Islamization of them. The Arabs did not however fully settle in the Beja areas as they looked for better climate in other areas. The Beja have partially mixed with Arabs through intermarriages over the centuries, and by the 15th century were absorbed into Islam. The process of Arabization led to the Beja adopting the Arabic language, Arab clothing, and Arab kinship organization.

== History ==
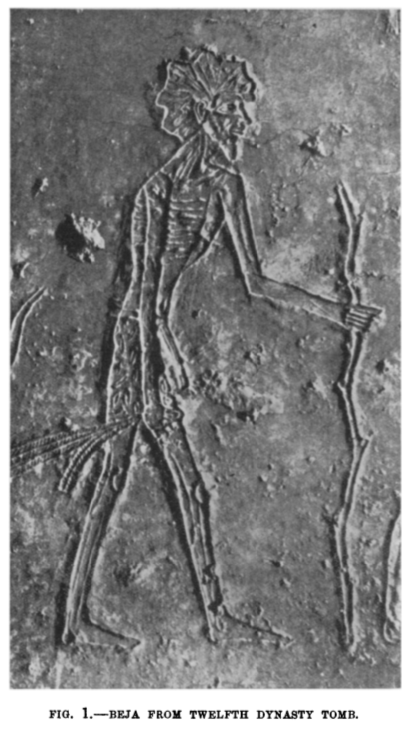
Beja figure on Twelfth Dynasty ancient Egyptian tomb

The Beja are traditionally Cushitic-speaking pastoral nomads native to northeast Africa, referred to as Medjay then Blemmyes in ancient texts. The geographer Abu Nasr Mutahhar al-Maqdisi wrote in the tenth century that the Beja were at that time Christians. Beja territories in the Eastern desert were conquered and vassalised by the Kingdom of Aksum in the third century. The historian Al-Yaqubi documented five Muslim Beja Kingdoms in the 9th century. Originally, the Beja did not speak Arabic, however the migration of the numerous Arab tribes of Juhaynah, Mudar, Rabi'a, and many more to the Beja areas contributed to the Arabization and Islamization of them, however the Arabs did not fully settle in the Beja areas as they looked for better climate in other areas. The Beja have partially mixed with Arabs through intermarriages over the centuries, and by the 15th century, the Beja were Islamized. The Balaw of the southern Red Sea coast may have come from the mixing of people from the Arab Peninsula and Beja people, but there has been significant historical dispute on this matter. The Hadendoa Beja by the 18th century dominated much of eastern Sudan. In the Mahdist War of the 1880s to 1890s, the Beja fought on both sides, the Hadendoa siding with the Mahdist troops, while the Bisharin and Amarar tribes sided with the British, and some Beni Amer - a subset of the Beja who live largely in Eritrea sided with the Ethiopian Ras Alula in certain battles, such as Kufit.

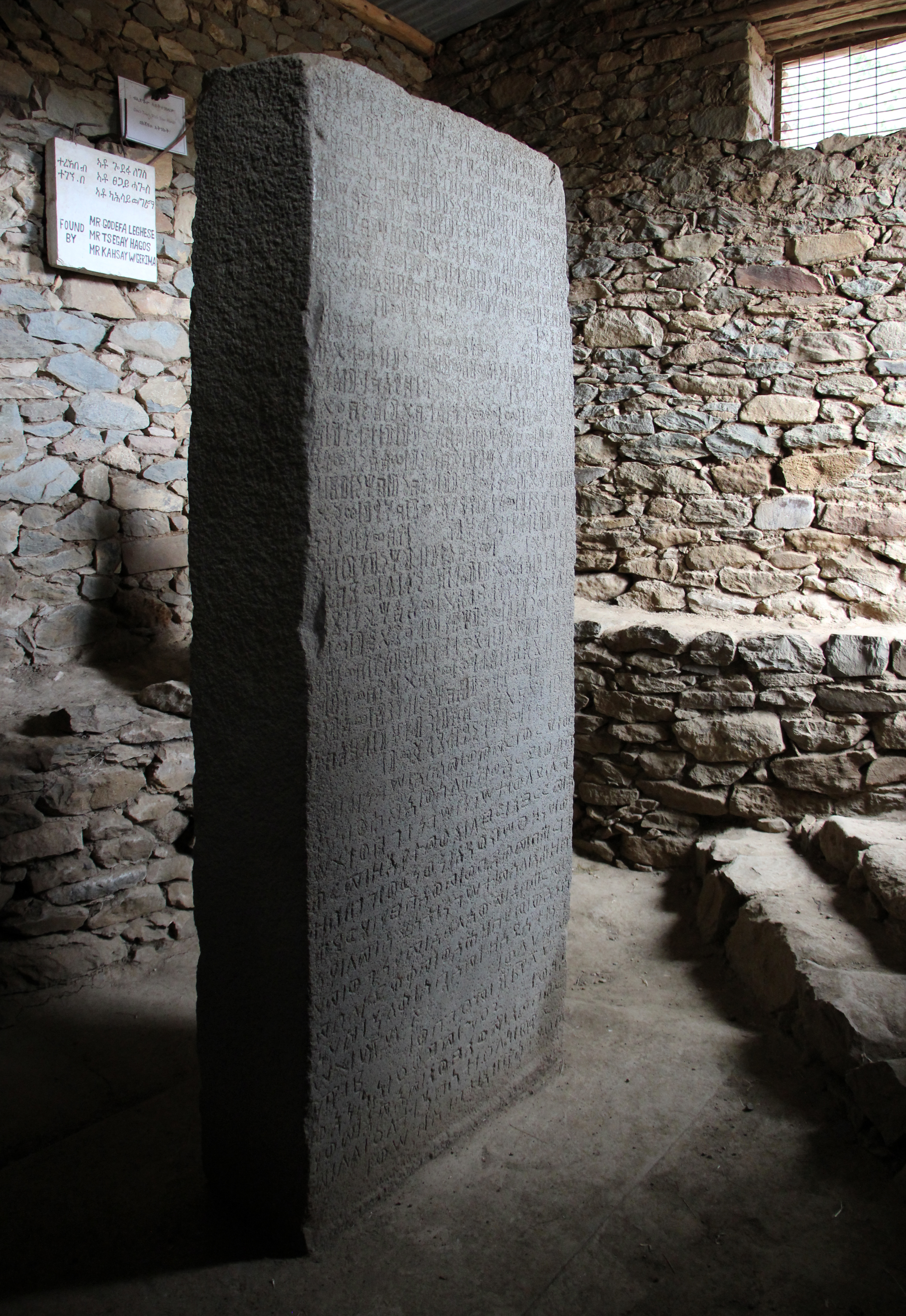
The fourth century Ezana Stone commemorates a Kingdom of Aksum foray into Beja territory and Meroe.

The Beja Congress was formed in 1952 with the aim of pursuing regional autonomy from the government in Khartoum. Frustrated by the lack of progress, the Beja Congress joined the insurgent National Democratic Alliance in the 1990s. The Beja Congress effectively controlled a part of eastern Sudan centered on Garoura and Hamshkoraib. The Beja Congress sabotaged the oil pipeline to Port Sudan several times during 1999 and 2000. In 2003, they rejected the peace deal arranged between the Sudanese government and the Sudan People's Liberation Army, and allied with the rebel movement of the Darfur region, the Sudan Liberation Movement/Army, in January 2004. A peace agreement was signed with the government of Sudan in October 2006. In the general elections in April 2010, the Beja Congress did not win a single seat in the National Assembly in Khartoum. In anger over alleged election fraud and the slow implementation of the peace agreement, the Beja Congress in October 2011 withdrew from the agreement, and later announced an alliance with the Sudan Liberation Movement/Army.

== Geography ==
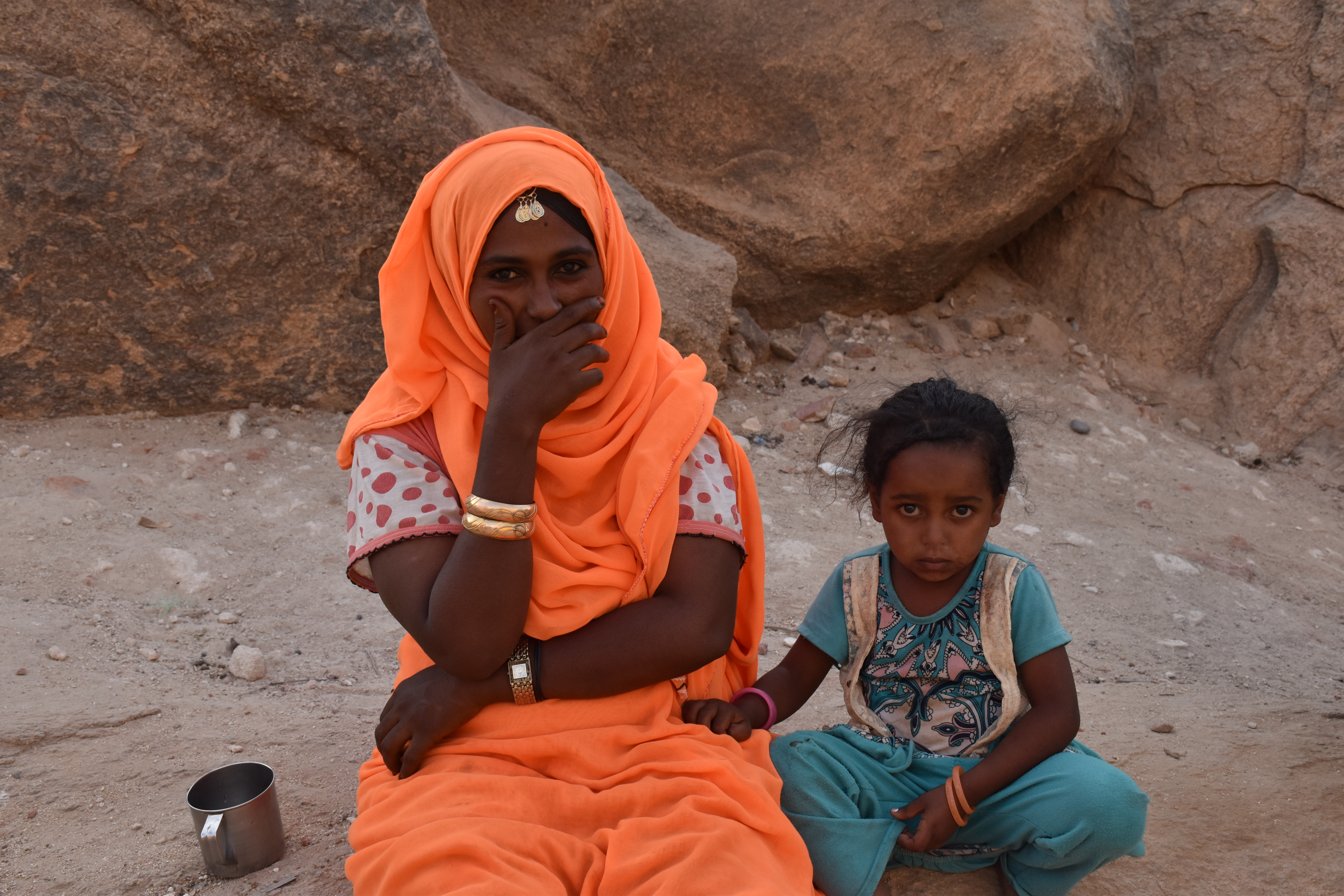
Beni-Amer woman with her daughter, Kassala state, Sudan.

The Beja people inhabit a general area between the Nile River and the Red Sea in Sudan, Eritrea and Egypt known as the Eastern Desert. Most of them live in the Sudanese states of Red Sea around Port Sudan, River Nile, Al Qadarif and Kassala, as well as the Northern Red Sea, Gash-Barka, and Anseba regions of Eritrea, and in southeastern Egypt in the Red Sea, Aswan, Luxor and Qena governorates specifically from the Sudanese border to Qena on the Nile and Hurghada on the Red Sea.

== Names ==
The Beja have been named "Medjay" in ancient Egyptian times then "Blemmyes" in Roman times, Bəga in Aksumite inscriptions in Ge'ez, and "Fuzzy-Wuzzy" by Rudyard Kipling. Kipling was specifically referring to the Hadendoa, who fought the British, supporting the Mahdi, the Sudanese leader of the war against Turkish-Egyptian rule, supported by the British Imperial administration.

== Language ==
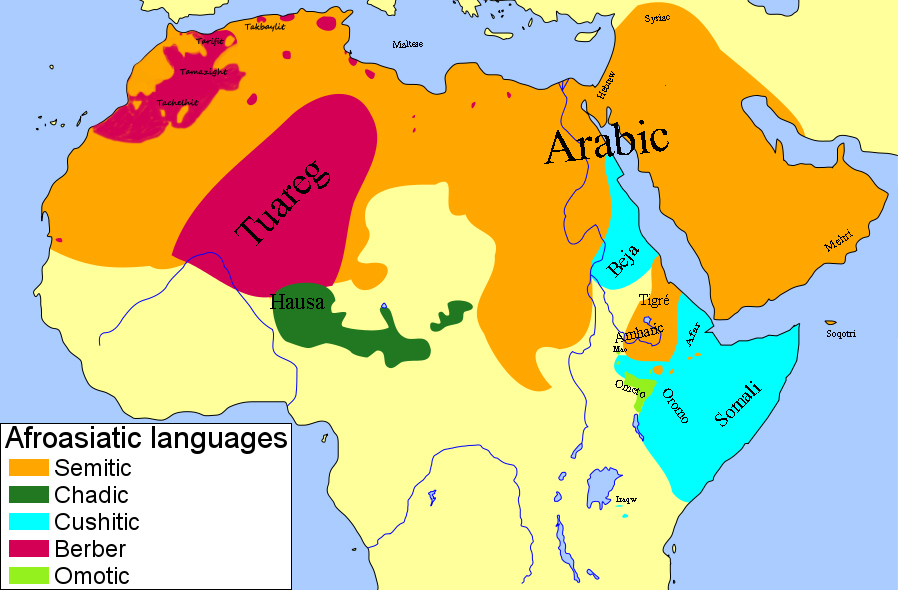
Geographical distribution of Afroasiatic languages. Beja speakers comprise the northernmost cyan zone, separated from the other Cushitic languages by Ethiosemitic speakers.

Many of the Beja speak Arabic, while some speak the Beja language, known as Bidhaawyeet or Tubdhaawi in that language. It belongs to the Cushitic branch of the Afroasiatic family. Cohen noted that the Beja language is the Cushitic language with the largest proportion of Semitic roots, and stated that they are in majority of Arabic origin.

The French linguist Didier Morin (2001) has made an attempt to bridge the gap between Beja and another branch of Cushitic, namely Lowland East Cushitic languages and in particular Afar and Saho, the linguistic hypothesis being historically grounded on the fact that the three languages were once geographically contiguous. Most Beja speak the Beja language, but certain subgroups use other lingua franca. The Beni Amer speak a variety of Tigre, whereas most of the Halenga and Ababda speak Arabic.

Although there is a marked Arabic influence, the Beja language is still widely spoken. The very fact that the highest moral and cultural values of this society are in one way or the other linked to their expression in Beja, that Beja poetry is still highly praised, and that the claims over the Beja land are only valid when expressed in Beja, are strong social factors in favour of its preservation. True enough Arabic is considered as the language of modernity, but it is also very low in the scale of Beja cultural values as it is a means of transgressing social prohibitions. Beja is still the prestigious language for most of its speakers because it conforms to the ethical values of the community.

== Subdivisions ==
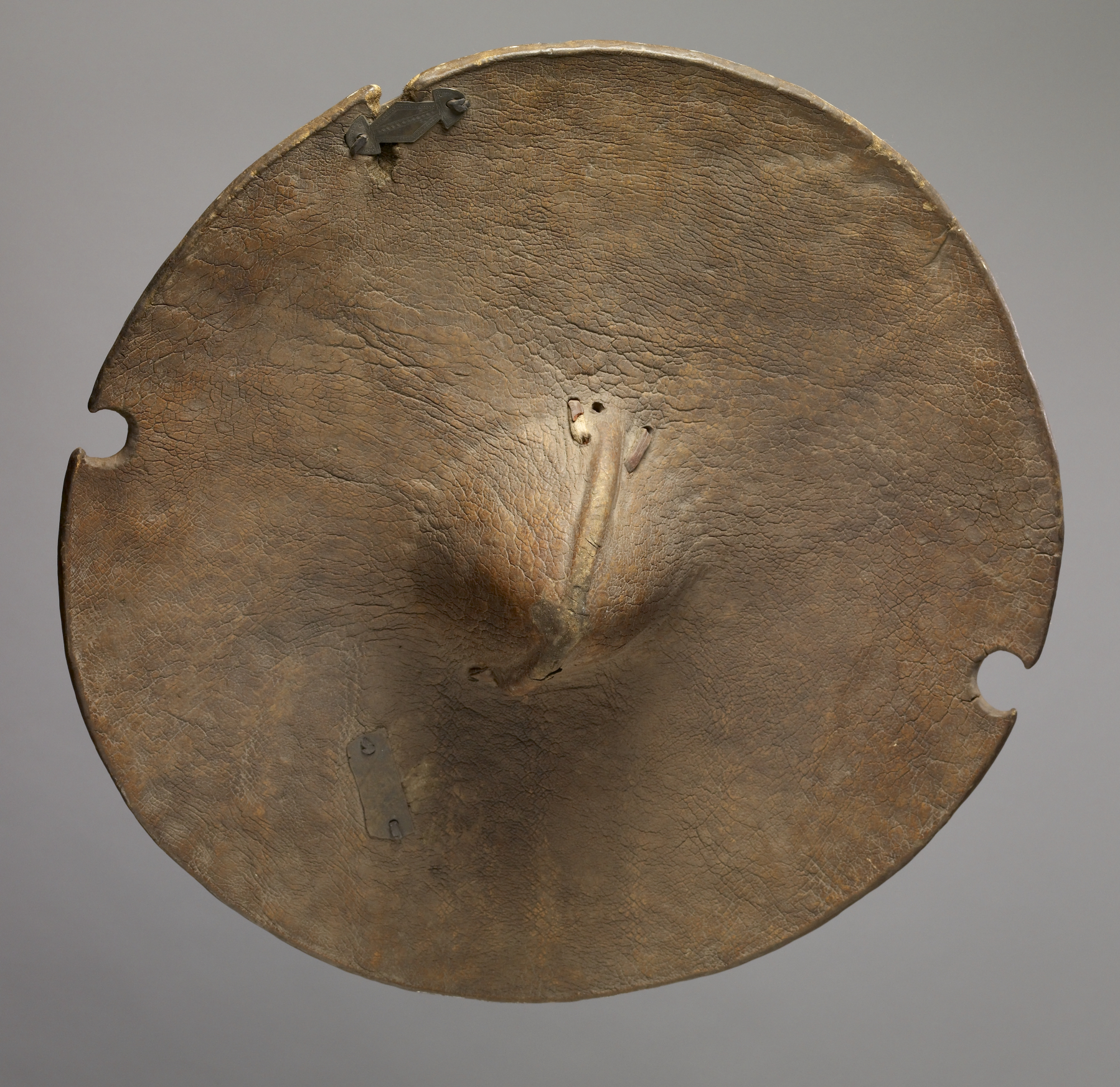
A Beja shield made of animal hide from the 20th century, in the collection of the Walters Art Museum

The Beja are divided into clan groups. These lineages include the Bishareen, Hedareb, Hadendoa, the Amarar (or Atmaan), Ababda, Beni Amer, Hallenga, Habab, Belin and Hamran, some of whom are partly mixed with Bedouins in the east. The Beni Amer are Beja-Tigre tribe who speak Tigre. The Ababda are an arabized Beja subtribe who currently speak Arabic but previously spoke the Beja language.

Beja society was traditionally organized into independent kingdoms. According to al-Ya'qubi, there were six such Beja polities between Aswan and Massawa in the 9th century. Among these were the Kingdom of Bazin, Kingdom of Belgin, Kingdom of Jarin, Kingdom of Nagash, Kingdom of Qita'a and Kingdom of Tankish.

== See also ==
- Afro-Arabs
- Demographics of Sudan
- History of Sudan
- Kingdom of Jarin
- Osman Digna
