= Northeast Africa =

African countries in the eastern part of North Africa

- Area: 7,301,000 km² (2,819,000 sq mi)
- Population: 355 million (2024)
- Population density: 48.6/km² (125.9/sq mi)
- GDP (nominal): $745 billion (2024)
- Demonym: Northeast African
- Countries: Djibouti; Egypt; Eritrea; Ethiopia; Libya; Somalia; South Sudan; Sudan
- Languages: Afroasiatic (Arabic, Eastern Berber, Ethio-Semitic, Cushitic), Nilo-Saharan (Nilotic, Fur, Nubian)

Northeast Africa, or Northeastern Africa is the region which is intermediate between North Africa and East Africa, and encompasses the Horn of Africa (Djibouti, Eritrea, Ethiopia, and Somalia), as well as Sudan, South Sudan, Libya, and Egypt.

The region has a very long history of habitation with fossil finds from the early hominids to modern human and is one of the most culturally and linguistically diverse regions of the world, being the home to many civilizations and located on an important trade route that connects multiple continents.

== Definitions ==
Statistical and geopolitical frameworks dispute the boundaries of Northeast Africa. The United Nations UN M49 classification bifurcates the area, placing Egypt and Libya in Northern Africa while grouping Sudan, South Sudan, and the Horn of Africa (Djibouti, Eritrea, Ethiopia, and Somalia) within Eastern Africa. The African Union adopts an identical division across its regional blocks. Conversely, academic outlets like the journal Northeast African Studies bypass these administrative splits to analyze the Nile Valley corridor and the Horn as a unified macro-region.

Historical, environmental, and commercial frameworks similarly integrate these territories. In The Philosophy of History, Georg Wilhelm Friedrich Hegel isolated Northeast Africa as "the land of the Nile"; a distinct civilizational tract linked to the Near East rather than to the Mediterranean or Africa proper. Environmental historians Douglas H. Johnson and David M. Anderson demonstrate that shared regional ecology overrides modern political borders to bind these diverse societies. Historian George Hatke reinforces this connectivity through millennia of maritime and overland commerce, framing Northeast Africa as a critical trade network linking sub-Saharan populations to the Mediterranean basin via Egypt, Nubia, and the Horn.

Northeast Africa
- Area: 4,655,873 km^{2} (1,797,643 sq mi)
- Population: 181 million (2024)
- Population density: 40/km² (103/sq mi)
- GDP (nominal): $527 billion (2024)
- Demonym: Northeast African
- Countries: Egypt; Libya; Sudan
- Languages: Afroasiatic (Arabic, Berber, Beja) and Nilosaharan (Toubou, Fur, Nubian)

=== Alternative Definitions ===
Some sources alternativly define the region as being the eastern part of North Africa solely includes Egypt, Libya, Sudan and no other countries.

== History ==
Linguistic, biological anthropological, archaeological, and genetic data reveal shared biological affinities between early Egyptians and indigenous northeastern African populations. Specifically, the Horn of Africa sourced the Y-chromosome lineage "M35/215", which tracked northward into Egypt and the Levant 17,000 years ago, mirroring the geographic dispersion of the Afrasian language family.

Scholars place the origins of predynastic southern Egypt within an indigenous northeast African community encompassing the Sudan, the Sahara, and tropical Africa. Pharaonic populations formed a physical cline, where Upper Egyptians possessed strong biological affinities with Sudanese and southern populations, whereas Lower Egyptians shifted closer to Levantine and Mediterranean cohorts. Nearby, ancient Nubians pioneered early antibiotics use, developed a geometric framework to construct initial sunclocks, and deployed a trigonometric methodology comparable to Egypt's.

Historical and geographic accounts place the maritime Land of Punt (recorded by Egyptians as "Ta Netjeru", or god's land) along the coasts of modern Somaliland, Somalia, Djibouti, Eritrea, and Sudan. Mentioned as early as the 25th century BCE, Puntite ports traded myrrh, gold, ebony, short-horned cattle, ivory, and frankincense across networks reaching the Phoenicians, Babylonians, Indians, Chinese, and Romans. A famous 18th-dynasty expedition dispatched by Queen Hatshepsut to Punt during the reigns of King Parahu and Queen Ati remains preserved on the temple walls of Deir el-Bahari. This interactive diplomacy was likely aided by a shared linguistic substrate spanning both Egypt and Punt.

Northeast African history involves dynastic, colonial, and center-periphery conflicts, initially focused on trade hubs, including Ifat conquest of the Makhzumi and the Ethiopian–Adal War, which drew Ottoman and Portuguese. Somali–Portuguese maritime chokepoint clashes occurred.

Colonial expansion and resistance, such as the Egyptian conquest of Sudan, the Mahdist War, and the First Italo-Ethiopian War, which ended at the Battle of Adwa. Fascist Italy later launched the Second Italo-Ethiopian War, incorporating the Horn of Africa into the East African Campaign of World War II.

During the Cold War, Berlin conference boundaries triggered interstate ethnonationalist irredentism, notably the Ogaden War, alongside liberation struggles like the Eritrean War of Independence, South Sudanese Wars of Independence, and the Somaliland War of Independence. Internal campaigns, including the First Sudanese Civil War, Second Sudanese Civil War, and Ethiopian Civil War.

State fragility, ethnic tensions, and asymmetric warfare from collapsed authoritarianism fueled Somali Civil War, South Sudanese Civil War, and the current Sudan conflict. Unresolved boundaries triggered the Eritrean–Ethiopian War and War in Darfur, while institutional vacuums feed the Al-Shabaab insurgency and the contemporary War in Amhara.

== Demographics ==
Northeast Africa's demographic layout bridges the Nile Valley, Mediterranean coast, and Horn of Africa. Arabs predominate in Egypt, Sudan, and Libya, alongside indigenous Copts, Nubians, and Beja along the Nile. The Horn anchors major ethnic groups like the Oromo, Amhara, Somalis, Tigrayans, and Afar, while Nilotic communities like the Dinka, Nuer, and Fur inhabit south-central river basins.

Two language families dominate the region: Afroasiatic and Nilo-Saharan languages. The Afroasiatic phylum comprises Semitic branches (Arabic, Amharic, Tigrinya), Cushitic variants (Oromo, Somali, Afar), and Omotic languages or Coptic remnants. The south-central watersheds use Nilo-Saharan tongues, including the Dinka language, Nuer language, Fur language, and Nubian languages.

Sufism within Sunni Islam, and Christianity govern regional identity alongside Traditional African religions. Islam prevails across Egypt, Sudan, Libya, Somalia, and Djibouti, with substantial cohorts in Eritrea and Ethiopia. The region's ancient Christian heritage resides in Oriental Orthodox Churches specifically the Coptic, Ethiopian, and Eritrean bodies alongside Protestantism and the Catholic Church. Traditional spiritual systems persist in South Sudan. The aggregate population totals 355 million, clustering at a high population density within the Nile Delta and coastal urban centers.

== Economy ==
Egypt and Djibouti drive Northeast Africa’s economy by leveraging the Suez Canal and Bab-el-Mandeb—handling 12% of global trade—to secure vital maritime and industrial revenues. Djibouti and Port Sudan serve landlocked neighbors but face Red Sea geopolitical and shipping volatility. Djibouti leases military base space to foreign powers for over $300 million annually, yielding 10% of its gross domestic product. Concurrently, Addis Ababa gains major service and diplomatic capital as headquarters of African Union.

Extractive resources dictate budgets, with precious metals increasingly driving state survival strategies. Libya operates as a pure hydrocarbon exporter, targeting 1.6 million barrels of crude oil daily, South Sudan faces budget volatility from Sudan's pipeline shocks. Within Sudan itself, gold extraction is the country's primary economic lifeline, accounting for over 58% of export value. Informal artisanal mining produces 80% of the sector's annual gold output in the River Nile and Northern State. Gold control finances factions, driving the war economy. Conversely, the 5,150-MW Grand Ethiopian Renaissance Dam (GERD) lets Ethiopia export hydroelectricity and power domestic electric vehicle assembly and data mining. Meanwhile, Egypt diversifies manufacturing via the Suez Canal Economic Zone.

Agriculture, finance, and services drive regional employment and consumption. Nile cultivation thrives in Sudan, while rain-fed farming and pastoralism anchor Ethiopia's economy as a major global coffee exporter. Cross-border livestock trade is vital across Somalia, Ethiopia, and Sudan, supporting millions, generating up to 45% of Somalia's GDP, and supplying 58% of Gulf live animal demand via the Port of Berbera.

Somalia relies on diaspora funds, injecting over $1.7 billion annually via digital mobile money networks like Hormuud Telecom's EVC Plus. Remittances also generate up to 30% of Eritrea's GDP. In Sudan, diaspora capital outpaces official aid.

== Cooperation ==
The Great Rift Valley system dominates the region's geography, extending from the Red Sea and Gulf of Aden through the Ethiopian Highlands. The Nile River basin, fed by the White and Blue Niles, forms the primary agricultural and hydrological artery for Egypt, Sudan, and South Sudan, fueling modern hydropolitics. The climate shifts from the hyper-arid northern Sahara and Danakil Depression to southern equatorial monsoon zones, exposing the landscape to cyclic droughts and floods.

Afroasiatic (Cushitic, Semitic, Omotic) and Nilo-Saharan languages groups anchor the regional ethnolinguistic profile. Geopolitically, these nations align through multilateral bodies like the Intergovernmental Authority on Development (IGAD), the Common Market for Eastern and Southern Africa (COMESA), and the Nile Basin Initiative.

== See also ==
- Genetic history of Africa
- Cradle of civilization
- North Africa
- Ancient Egypt
- Ancient Libya
- Nubia
- Rauso
- Aromata
- Barbaria
- Classical African civilizations
- Cradle of humanity
- Genetic history of Africa
- Horn of Africa
- Aksum
- Ethiopian Empire
- Land of Punt
