= Egyptian cultural dress =

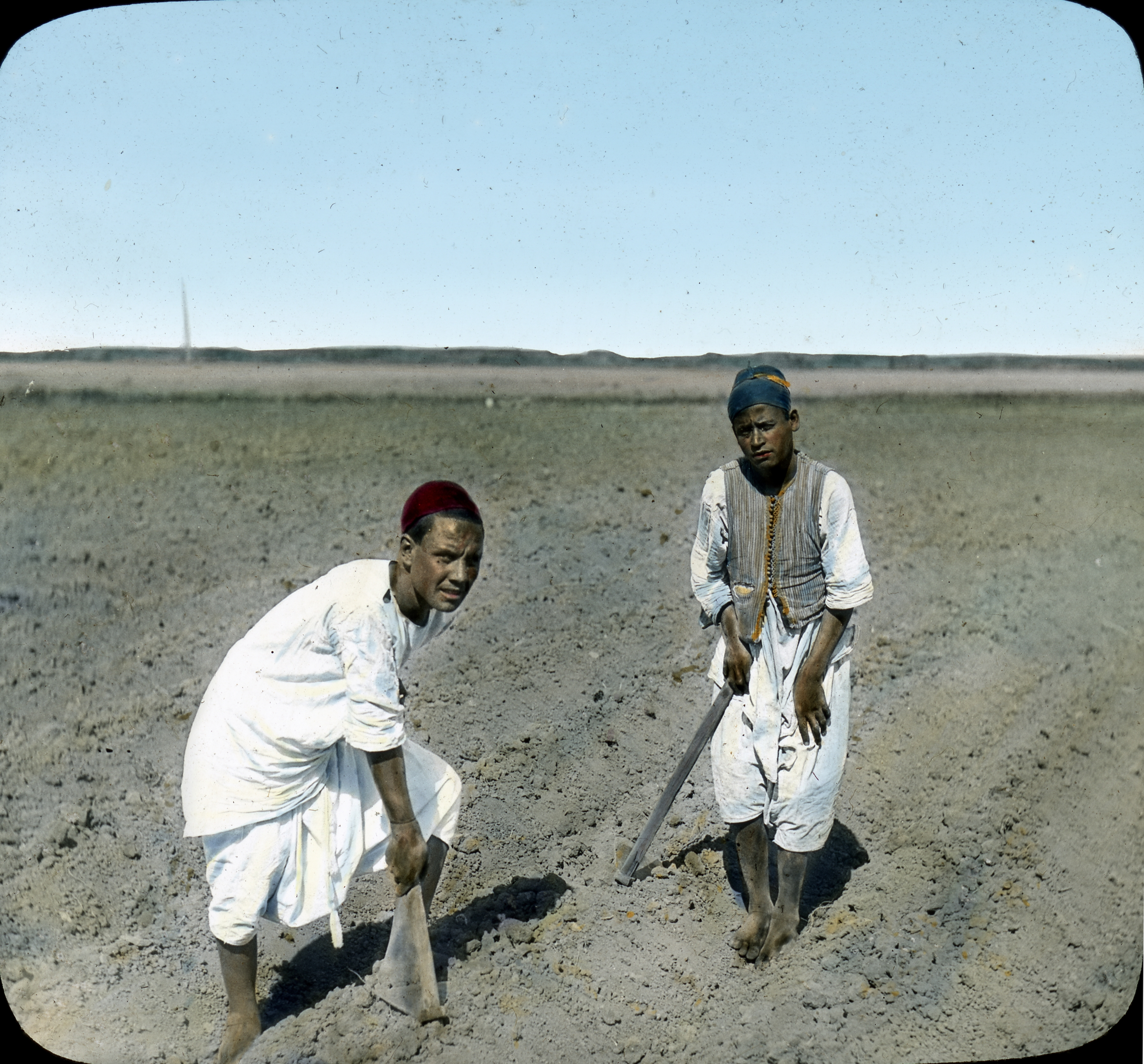
Farmers at work. Both men are wearing libas, or short sirwal. The man on the right is wearing a tarboosh, and the man on the left is wearing a sedria.

Egyptian cultural dress is the clothes, shoes, jewelry, and other items of fashion common to the Egyptian people and recognizable as particularly representative of Egyptian culture.

== Pre-Ptolemaic ==
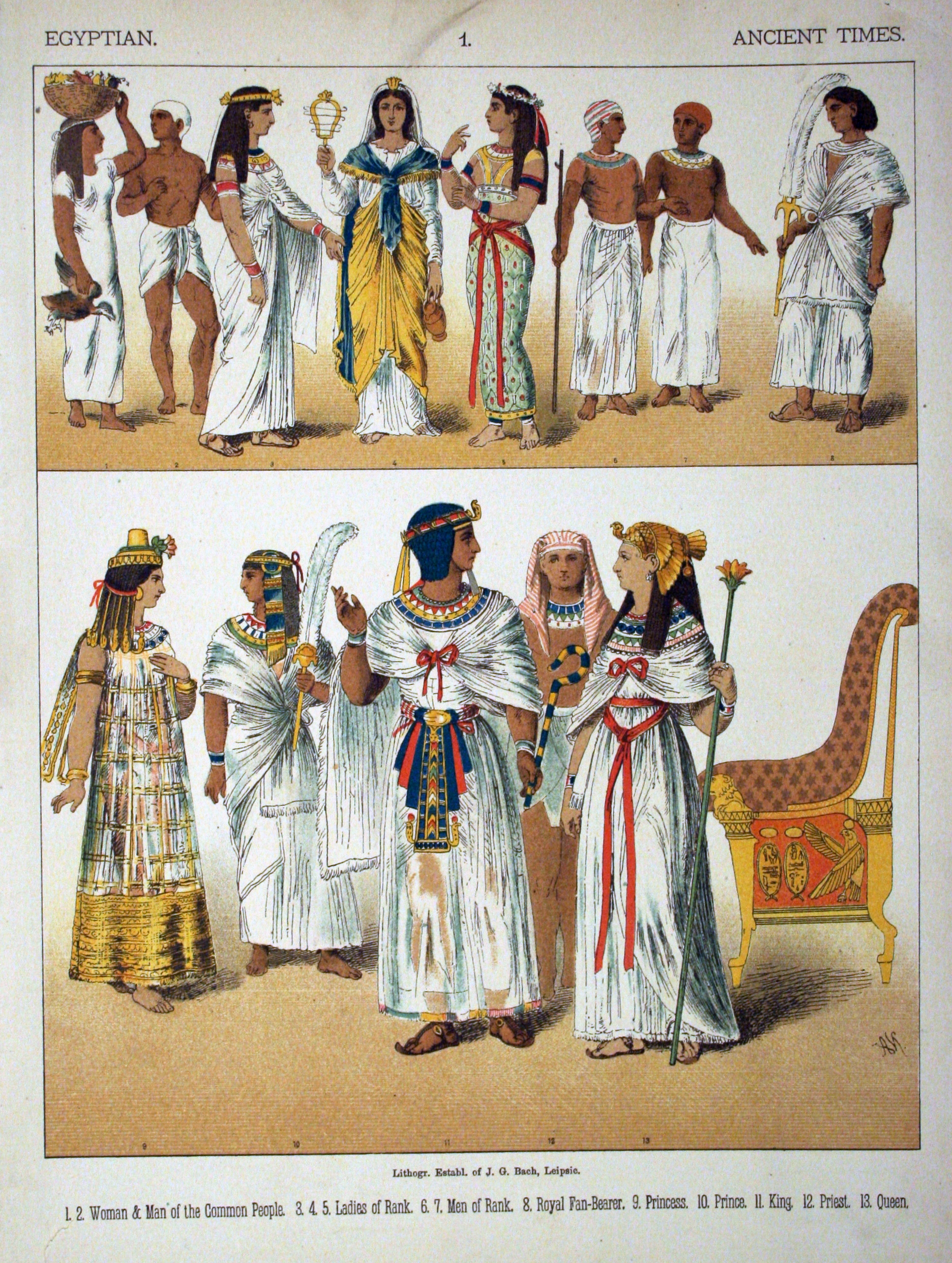
Various Ancient Egyptian clothes and jewelry including an undecorated tunic (1), a decorated sheath dress (5), a shendyt (2), a cape & skirt ensemble (13), one of the draping styles for the sari-like garment (3)

Ancient Egyptian dress can broadly be divided into types of tunics, robes, skirts, and shawls, typically made of linen. These were sometimes decorated with print, woven, and embroided patterns, though such decoration was more common on accessories. Children typically went unclothed.

Ancient Egyptian men often wore a wrapped skirt or kilt called a shendyt or schenti, which came in various styles. Loincloth of linen were also common, and a style of loincloth made of leather with slits cut into it to make the material readily expand was also used.

Ancient Egyptian women often wore a type of sheath dress, which was idealized as quite tight in art. This dress varied in design from a tube of fabric that ended before the bust and was held up by straps, to a more modest T shaped tunic style. Women also sometimes wore a skirt and cape, particularly in combination with each other. The length of one's skirt or cape was often an indication of status, as was the use of more fabric in garment production more generally. Another form of dress was a long piece of fabric wrapped around the body to form a dress-like garment, similar to the wrapping of a sari or melaya leff.

Both genders sometimes wore a loose caftan which would be draped in different ways with the aid of a woven belt or knots. Men sometimes wore this caftan loose and unbelted instead. A surviving example of a belt that could be used in such a way is the Ramses Girdle, which has an intricate pattern that would likely have taken four months to weave.

Garments worn by both genders tended to have a higher waistline defined for women, while men defined the waistline around the hips.

Both genders wore makeup and jewelry. Jewelry was extensive and varied, including necklaces (such as pectorals, menat, broad collars), bracelets, anklets, and rings (especially seal rings). Girdles were one of the oldest forms of known jewelry in Egypt. Earrings were not common in Egypt until the New Kingdom, and were likely introduced from Nubia. Elaborate aprons made of beads or possibly decorated leather were typically worn by men of a high status, such as pharaohs. Materials for jewelry included gold, silver, turquoise, jasper, garnet, amazonite, agate, amethyst, feldspar, carnelian, obsidian, lapis, and faience. Glass started to be used in the New Kingdom. The color of a material may have often had a deeper, amuletic significance.

Sandals were worn by all classes of society, with the difference among classes being how the shoe was made and what materials were used. Open shoes were possibly introduced by the Hyksos, and closed leather shoes began to appear in the New Kingdom.

Many Ancient Egyptians wore wigs, hair extensions, or dyed their hair with henna. Men's wigs, especially of higher classes, tended to be more elaborate. Priests shaved their heads entirely.

== Post-Ptolemaic and late antiquity ==
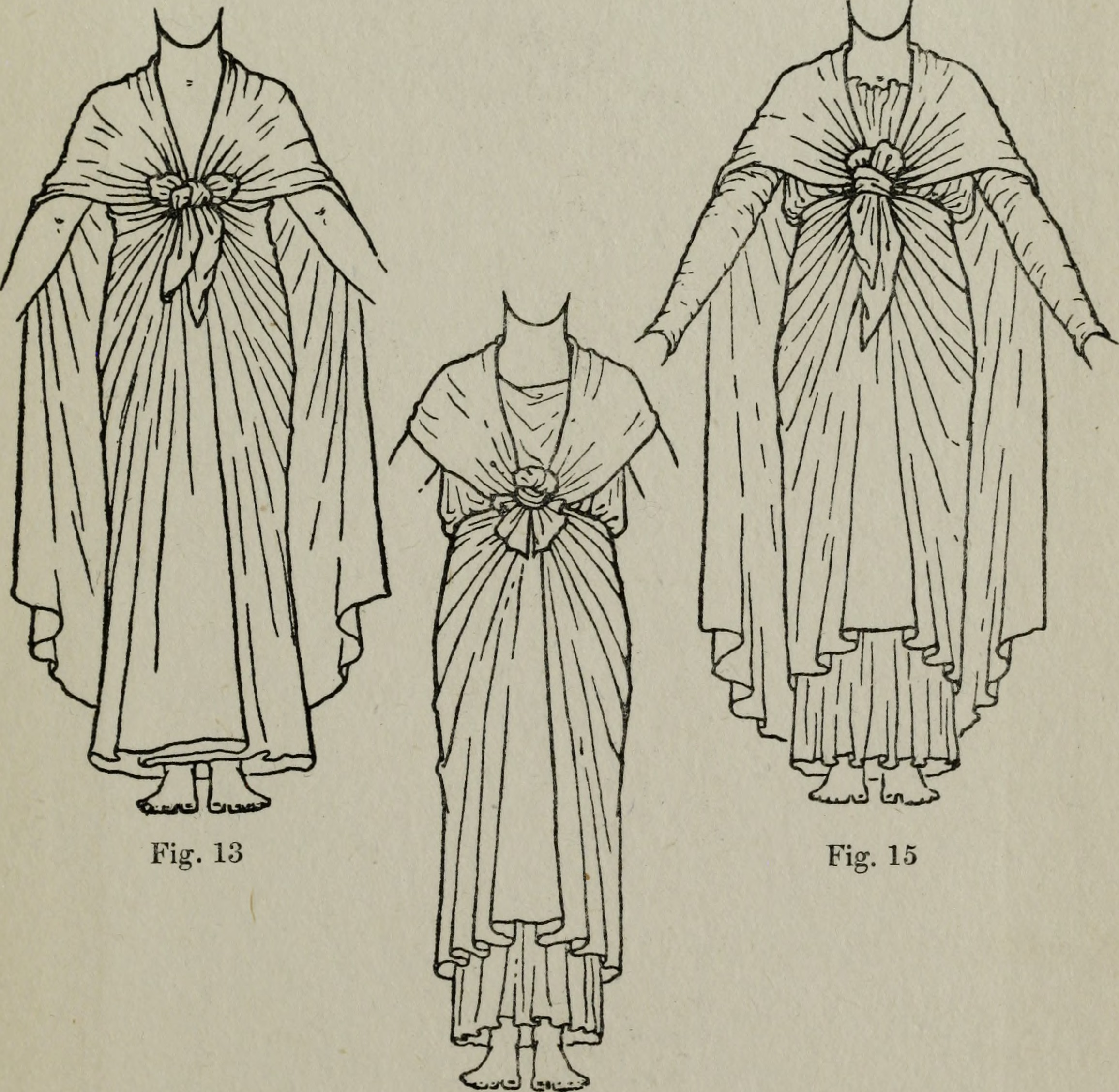
Later women's cape's and skirts over a tunic.

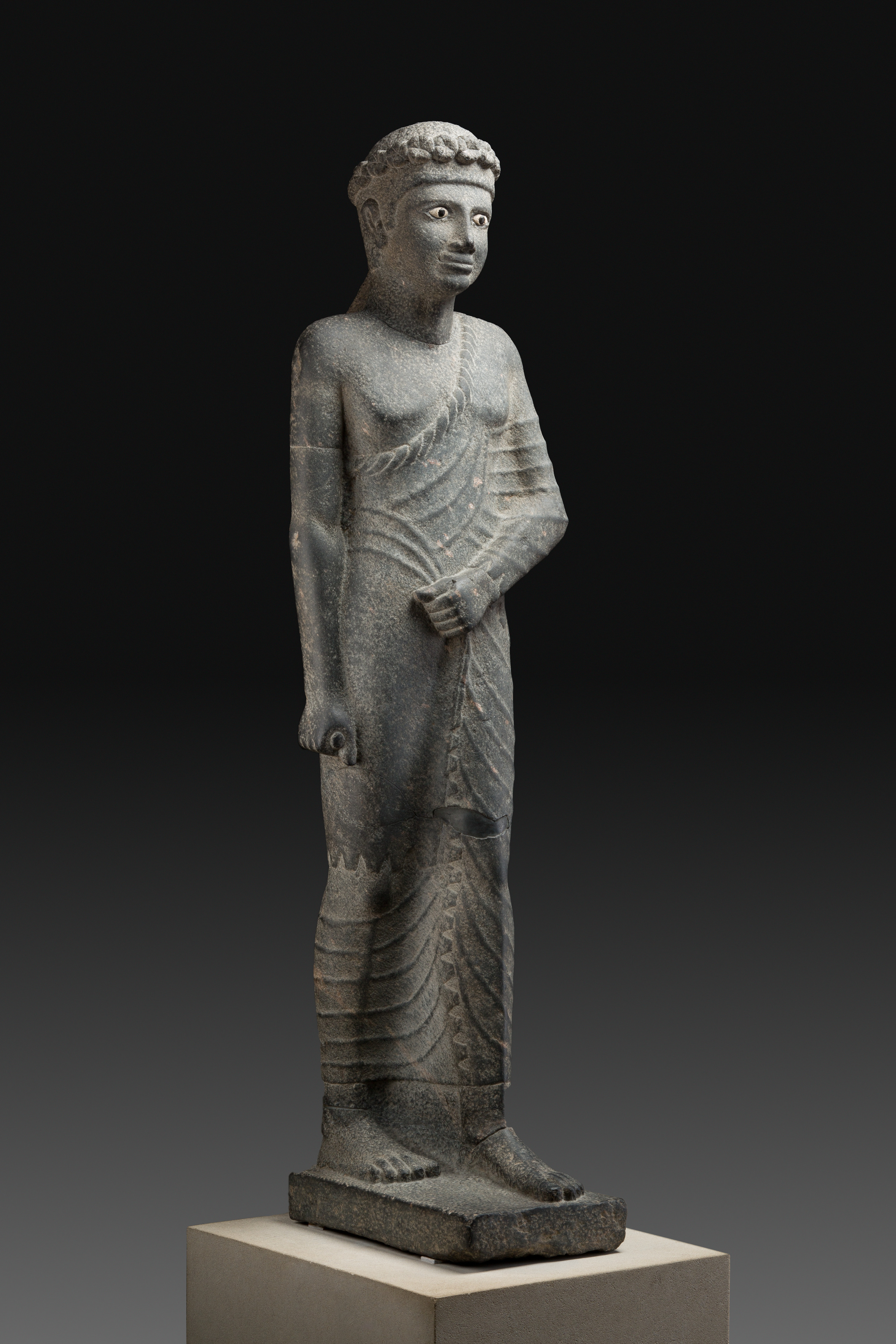
Statue of a Ptolemaic era official wearing a tunic, shendyt, and a mantle.

Fashions began a marked change with increased Hellenic influence. The Greeks introduced woolen clothes into Egypt, which gradually became more popular than linen. Cotton fabrics also appeared in the 2nd century CE, likely due to trade with Meroe.

The Roman's introduced their style of tunics with clavi and roundel decorations to Egypt, and not long after, sleeved tunics became generally popular. These decorations were made with tapestry weave (also known as kabaty). This style of decoration remained popular in Egypt, and eventually influenced Chinese weavers. Greek himations and Roman togas were also introduced. In the Coptic period, these styles remained popular.

Garments were overall similar in structure, with gender differences coming from style. Women preferred longer tunics and closed shoes, while men wore shorter tunics and sandals, or did not wear shoes at all. Women were also more likely to wear clothes with a dyed base fabric, and typically covered their hair with their mantle, or sprang caps.

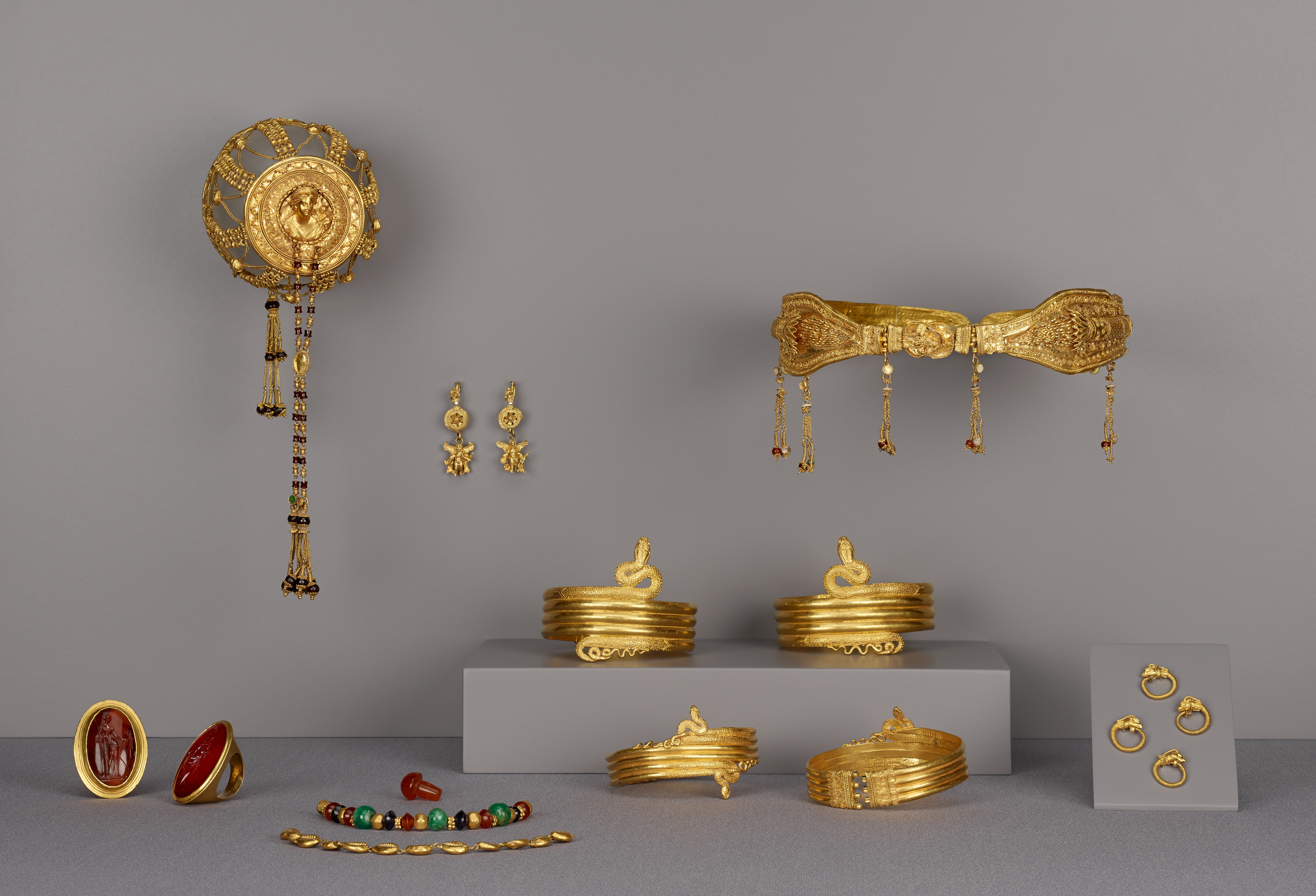
Various items of Ptolemaic jewelry.

== Medieval ==
Medieval Egyptian dress included a variety of turbans, coats, caftans, and tunics. The Fatimid period was particularly lavish in dress, with loose garments of high quality, highly decorated fabric. Silk became particularly popular and refined in the Mamluk period, and often incorporated art motifs from further east.

Earlier on, a common man might only wear tubban (briefs), sirwal, or sirwal and a short mantle. Worker's tunics, when worn, were typically knee length. Wool was common among the working class and even preferred. By the Mamluk period, nearly everyone wore trousers (sirwal) and a robe overtop, either a thob or a qamis. Sirwal could be full or knee length, with the latter being associated with the lower class. Long and ample sleeves were associated with higher status under the Mamluks, and could sometimes hide the hands entirely. Some were double the length of the arm. Dhimmis at this time were restricted to narrow sleeves.

Women wore, in addition to these basic items, mantles, face veils, and scarves over their hair which were kept in place with fillets called 'isaba. Evidence from the Cairo Geniza indicates Jewish and Muslim women dressed similarly, and that ghiyar wasn't particularly enforced, with the exception of al-Hakim and restrictions on color that later became the norm under the Mamluks. The Geniza indicates stripes were fairly common, as were checked patterns, but spots were uncommon. Gold embroidery and gilding were also popular, with the latter being less expensive. Fine garments were sometimes jeweled.

Ghiyar was a set of sumptuary laws meant to distinguish dhimmis from Muslims, which had slightly different statutes depending on time, and varied in how strictly it was enforced.

The Fatimid court provided an entire wardrobe to every official and their retainers, "from the turban to the underwear". Most of these were white with silver and gold embroidery. Ranks were distinguished by the specifics of each costume.

The popular undershirt up until the Mamluks was the ghilala, which was eventually replaced by the qamjun.

One popular garment was the qaba, which came in two main varieties; the Turkish style (al-aqbiya al-turkiyya), and the Tatar (or Mongolian) style (al-aqbiya al-tatariyya or qabā' tatarī). The latter fastened on the wearer's right side, and was preferred by Mamluk amirs in its day over the former style, which was favored by the Seljuks and Ayyubids. Both varieties had a waist seam and sometimes had a pleated or gathered skirt, and fastened with buttons or strings. It was typically knee or calf length. The Qaba likely belongs to a garment family which stems from the Mongolian terlig and includes the jama and tieli. It is also possibly of Turkic origin. Open coats also existed and were layered over other coats and robes.

The jukaniyya was a sleeved women's garment made of linen, brocade, or silk. It may have been named after the Persian town of Juwakan, or it may have been named after a game of polo, indicating the garment resembled a polo jacket, a short coat with narrow sleeves.

The makhtuna was a women's garment that may have occasionally been worn by men. It was made of costly fabrics such as brocades, siglaton, and silks.

The badlan was a short sleeveless unisex tunic from the Arabian peninsula that was popular with Egyptian women.

The aba was a sleeveless square coat that was sewn up the sides and opened in the front, typically worn by men.

Robes of honor (khila') and garments with tiraz bands were given as signs of royal favor, but common people such as merchants would give these out as well to friends and to their betrotheds.

The futa was a sari-like long cloth imported from India and chiefly worn by women. It was used for many purposes, including as a loincloth, apron, and headwear.

The tikka was a drawstring for sirwal. It was sometimes made of nicer fabric such as silk, embroidered, jeweled, and/or perfumed. Some women gave it to their lovers as a token of affection.

In the Mamluk era, a counted running stitch technique was popular. This was likely one of the predecessors of European blackwork. The Mamluk embroidery was commonly done in black, red, or blue, though other colors were used. In turn, this embroidery likely came to Egypt from the Indian subcontinent, where it is known as Kasuti.

In the 13th century, kasabji was a prominent style of embroidery produced in Cairo. This was used to make the Kiswah, and eventually came to be used for clothing; by this time it started to be called Sarma or sirma, and came to be associated with Ottoman fashions.

The mintaqa was a sword belt, often worn with a qaba and sirwal by soldiers. It was sometimes decorated with metal. Under the Abbasid Caliphate it was prohibited from being worn by dhimmis. The hiyasa was a belt of petal plaquettes that descended from it, and initially was a military belt. It was usually made of silver, but sometimes it was also made of gold or jade. The finest ones were also set with gems. A scarf was often tucked into it and left hanging. Other jeweled metal belts were also popular.

Caps and turbans were worn by most men, as it was improper to be in public without one. These came in a variety of forms, and could be the most expensive items a man wore. Different hats and turbans were chosen for fashion reasons, but sometimes also had special significance. The Fatimid Caliph had a special turban (al taj al sharif) made of a cap with a mandil wound around it in the shape of a myrobalan. It was decorated all over with jewels, and a solitaire mounted on a silk fillet would be tied to sit in the center of the forehead. The Ayyubids and Mamluks adopted hats from further east as well, particularly from the Mongolians.

The qalansuwa was usually a tall cap (described miter like, shaped like a sugar loaf, or shaped like an inverted amphora (dann) and subsequently also called a danniyya) made from a reed or wood frame that was covered in fabric. Until the 11th century, a tall one was used as uniform of judges. Variations existed, such as the short and round variants, which were usually made of fur (especially fox) or fabric, and had a winding cloth for a turban. Originally the hat was short, and sometimes qalansuwa referred to a hood.

The tartura or tartur was a tall cap, and was first mentioned in a 7th-century papyrus. It may have come from an Aramaic speaking region.

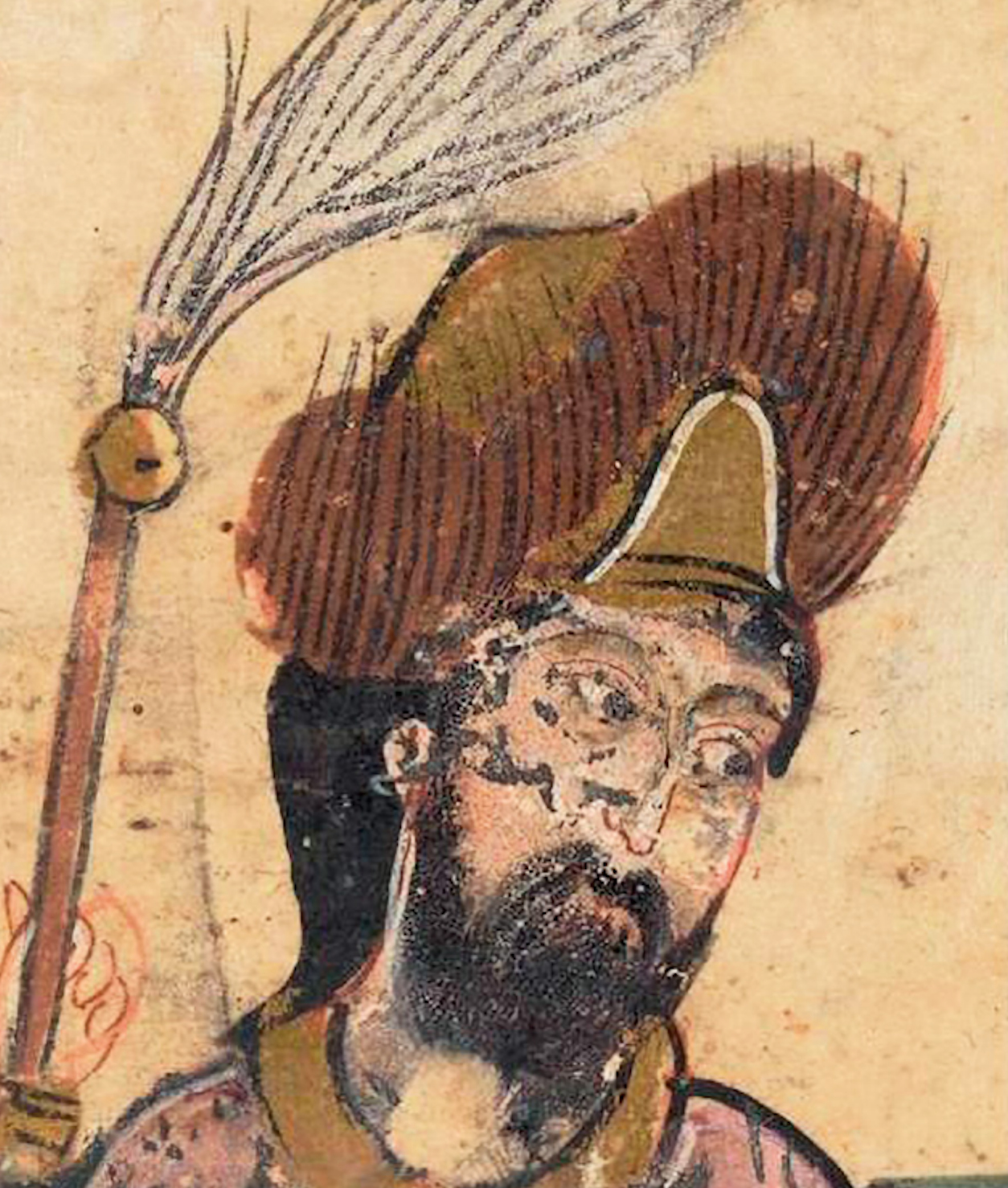
Sharbush from the Maqamat de Hariri

The normal military hat under the Ayyubids and Mamluks was called a sharbush. It was a stiff hat trimmed with fur that had a triangular front. Sometimes it was wound with a small kerchief to make a turban called a takhfifa.

The zamt was a hairy cap that was typically red in color, also worn under the Mamluks with a military association.

The kalawta varied in shape and size. At first it was yellow, but over time red became the proper color. It was made of wool or fabric shot with gold. It was also used for takhfifa. It was ay one point an official military cap, and eventually became a schoolboy hat.

the saraquj was a conical hat with a brim that could be turned up or down. It was popular under the Mamluks, though in art, Asian men are the ones typically shown wearing it. It was usually white or tan, but could be other colors as well. The tip could have a metal knob, pointed plaque, tuft, or long feathers attached. It could also be used to make a takhfifa with a colorful scarf and a brooch. It resembles a witch hat in Western art.

By the Mamluk period, knee high boots were popular with men, especially higher class men. Taller boots were cut so they still ended below the knee in the back. These boots were often red, brown, or black, and had blazon decorations. Nobles often wore decorative spurs on their boots. Some soldiers and officials wore cloth leggings that only covered the calf instead. These were called ran and originally came from Persua or Central Asia.

Fatimid jewelry was typically made of gold with filigree and granulation techniques. Enamel and niello were also popular techniques. Animals, palmettes, flowers, scrolls, crescents, and geometric patterns were popular in design, and were usually symmetrical.

== Modern ==
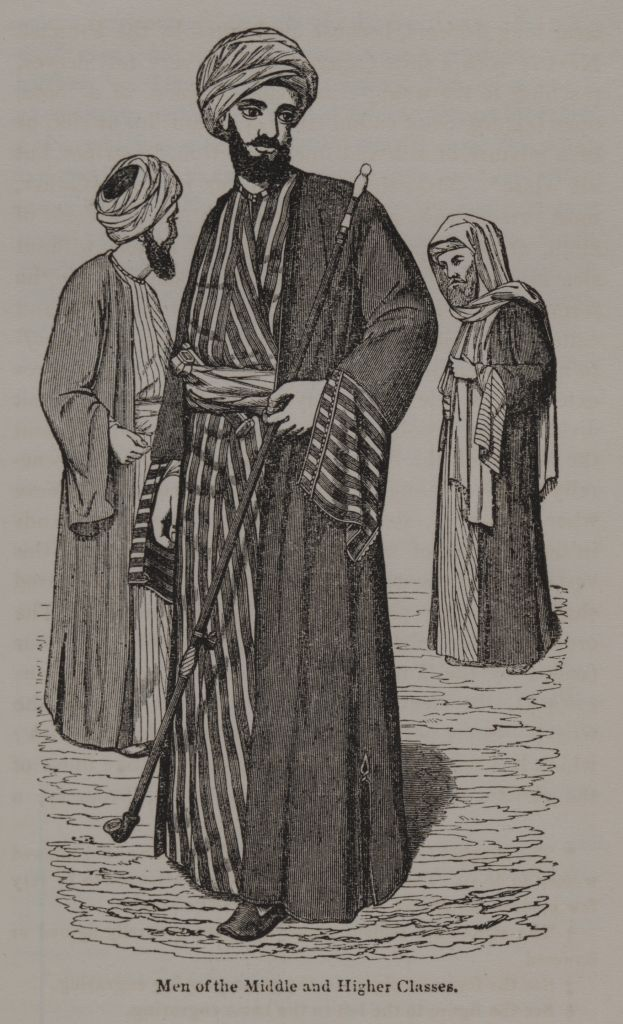
Typical middle and upper class Egyptian men's dress in the 19th century.

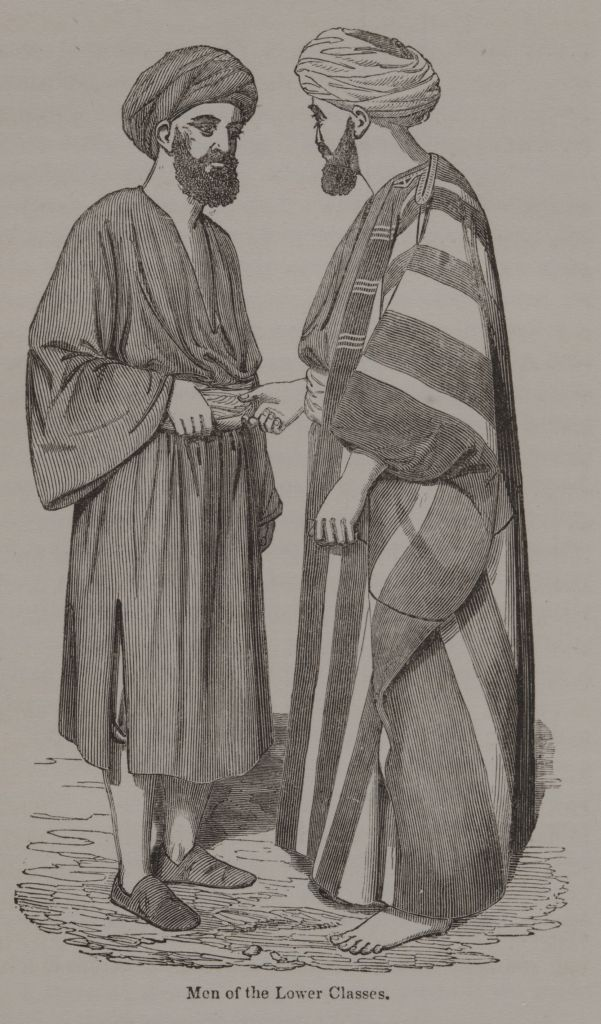
Lower-class men of the 19th century.

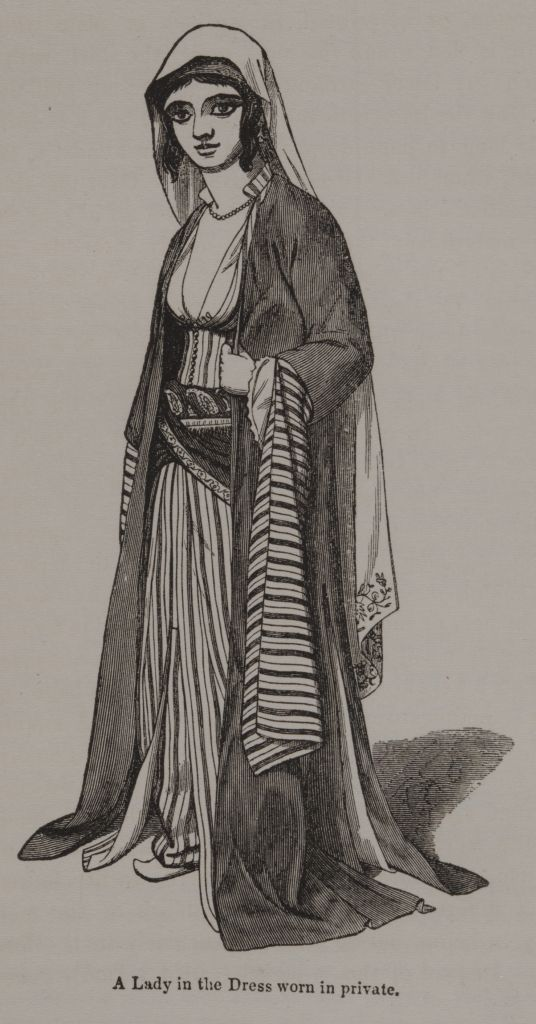
A 19th century Egyptian woman without her outer layers.

In the 17th century, the rural men's robe was made of coarse wool with wide sleeves and closed in the front. The urban man's, however, was made of fine wool, and was tight in the upper arm, but wide at the end.

The drawers of an Egyptian man of the 1830s were called libas. They were made of cotton or linen, and had an embroided dikkeh/tikkeh (drawstring). The drawers were typically knee or ankle length, with some religious men preferring the former due to a prohibition on the latter attributed to Mohammed.

The wealthy and middle-class men's shift of the time was white, had full sleeves, and made of linen, cotton, muslin, silk, or silk-cotton stripe. It was an underlayer. The lower-class men's shifts were often an outer layer. Theirs were commonly made of blue cotton or linen (an 'eree) or brown wool (a zaaboot). Both had wide sleeves and a neck opening that reached the waist.

Men's caftans were typically made of striped cotton and silk, though brocade was once popular, and they were lined with ramie. They were typically worn with a fabric belt (hizan or hizam), and may have a matching vest, called a sedria. They were typically ankle length, and the older style was to cut the sleeves so they extended a few inches past the fingertips and had a slit up to the wrist. This enabled the hands to be covered, as was the custom in the presence of those of higher status.

Over the caftan, shift, or sometimes underneath the shirt (as was preferred by lower-class men), was the sedria, a sleeveless vest made of silk or cotton. A girdle of white muslin or a colored shawl may be worn over the sedria or caftan as well, with lower-class men sometimes wearing their girdle or a red leather belt over just their shift.

Over the caftan, a coat such as a binish or djubbeh would be worn. The binish was a wide sleeved robe worn by scholars throughout the Near East, made of dark fabric with a silk facing. The sleeve sometimes had a slit on the bottom. Some distinguished the slit-less coat by calling it the farageeyeh (or faragiya). The djubbeh (or jubba, or gibbeh) had a more complicated cut and narrow sleeves, which ended just above the wrist. It was also worn by Kurds.These garments were also worn by women in silk or velvet fabrics and brighter colors and embroidery. These were a narrower cut than men's djubbeh and worn over the yelek. Some women wore a saltah instead of the djubbeh, which was also of embroidered velvet or cloth. These caftans and coats persisted in Egypt into the early 20th century.

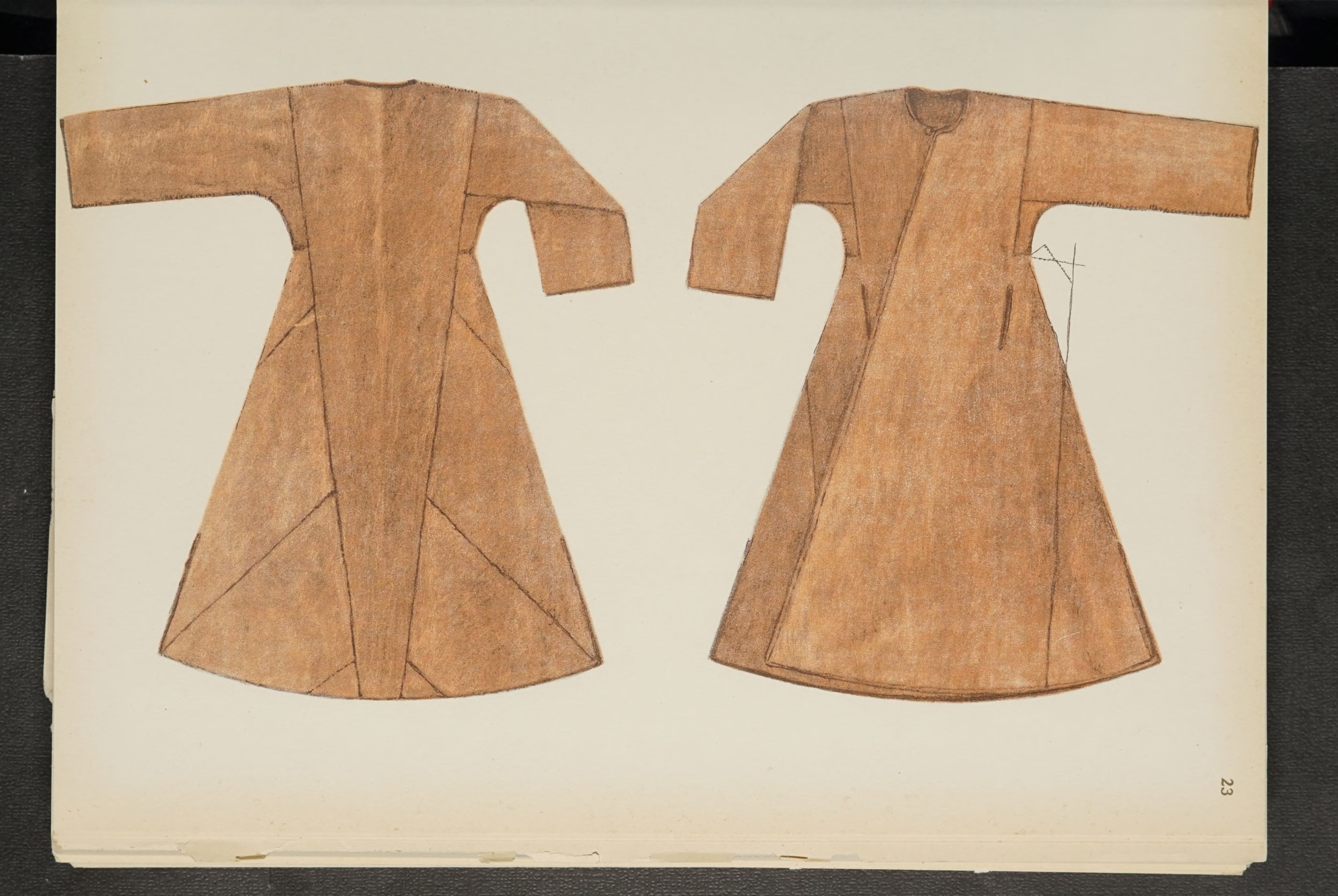
Djubbeh

The topmost layer was a square cloak called and abayeh or aba. It was often made of wool, and sometimes black, but blue and white and brown and white stripe were also common in the 1830s. Brighter colors such as purple or blue, with metal thread decoration, are also found in some extant 19th-century examples. A cloak like the aba, but fuller, also existed. It was called a diffeeyeh and usually black or blue in color. Some middle-class men also might wear a black cotton gown over their clothes to avoid appearing wealthy.

The turban of the 19th-century consisted of a taqiya as the base layer, a tarboosh, and then a white muslin or Kashmir shawl (particularly in cool weather) wound around it. Poorer men usually used a scarf of red, yellow, or white wool, or a scarf of coarse cotton or muslin. Some poor men only wore the taqiya. Descendants of the Prophet Muhammad had the privilege of wearing green turbans. The dhimmis of the 1830s typically wore black, blue, grey, or light brown turbans and dull colored clothes.

The tarboosh was implemented in Egypt by Mahmud Khan II's promotion of it in the Ottoman Empire as modern dress, and by Mohammed Ali, who initially mandated its use in military uniforms. Under Mohammed Ali, the first Egyptian-made tarboosh was produced in 1825.

Stockings were uncommon in the 1830s. When worn they were of cotton and wool. The most common shoes were pointed slippers of a leather called "Morocco", with red for outdoors and yellow for indoors. Shoes were commonly layered so one could slip off their outdoor shoes without being barefoot while inside. The inkhorn, pencase, dagger, and case knife were often tucked into a man's girdle and worn openly. A tobacco purse and embroided kerchief were also often tucked into the chest of the caftan. Some men in the 1830s wore a blue and white melaya leff, thrown over the shoulders or wrapped around the body.

The 19th-century man usually had a seal ring, even if he was poor. It was worn on the right little finger. It was commonly of silver with a stone such as carnelian set into it. The stone was engraved with one's name and some manner of religious phrase.

19th-century Egyptian men shaped their facial hair by shaving or plucking above and below the lower jaw, and a small portion below the lower lip. The mustache and rest of the beard were kept short, but otherwise left alone. Dyeing grey beards was not common. Many men also shaved their hair except for a tuft at the top, though intellectuals looked down on this haircut.

A typical servant's costume of the 1830s had a white shift, a sedria, a caftan or a djubbeh or both, and a blue shirt as the outermost layer. The sleeves of the white shirt, which were very full, were sometimes tied back with a cord.

Egyptian men often wear a galabiya, and may wear a taqiya, sometimes with a turban. A sedria may be worn under the galabiya. Egyptian men do not typically wear jewelry in the modern day, though they may wear prayer beads.

The modern galabiya has a low scooped neckline with a slit in the bottom. Sometimes this slit has buttons to close it. The sleeves and hem flare out to be very wide. It is made of paler, lighter colors in summer, and darker, heavier fabric for winter. The outer galabiya is sometimes embellished with braid.

The modern turban is usually simple, cotton in summer and wool in winter. Certain trends for how it is wrapped or what color scarves are used occur regionally, but there aren't clear trends. The taqiya may be crocheted, or of brown felt or wool.

16th century European travelers remarked upon the common dress of Egyptian women to be a large blue chemise with wide sleeves, similar to that of Egyptian men. This is reiterated in Description de l’Égypte, which comes from the 18th century. Most Egyptian women wore a tob, with its hem hitting anywhere between the hips and feet, over a pair of baggy trousers. It was dyed blue and undecorated. The tob likely descends from the bahṭala, a Mamluk era garment. As of the late 19th century, this description is repeated, with the added detail of red embroidery around the neckline. It is likely that wealthier women's gowns had even more extensive embroidery than these descriptions, as European travelers would have only had contact with very poor women, who could not afford embroidery, or very wealthy urban women, who wore Ottoman fashions. Rural middle class and wealthy women would not have often been seen in their finery in public by foreigners who ventured out of the cities.

The common clothing for 19th century Egyptian women included a yelek or entari (anteri), a close fitting caftan derived from Turkish dress of either floor, hip, or waist length, vests, a shift, a sash, baggy pants (shintiyan), and outer garments for going out in public. This outfit was first adopted by Egyptian women in 1547. The sedria was sometimes worn by lower-class women, particularly dancers.

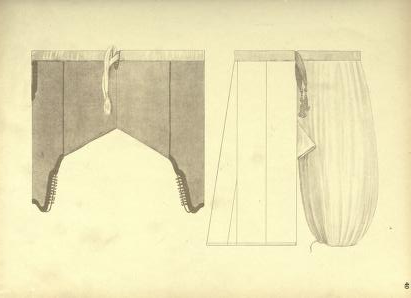
Shintiyan (right)

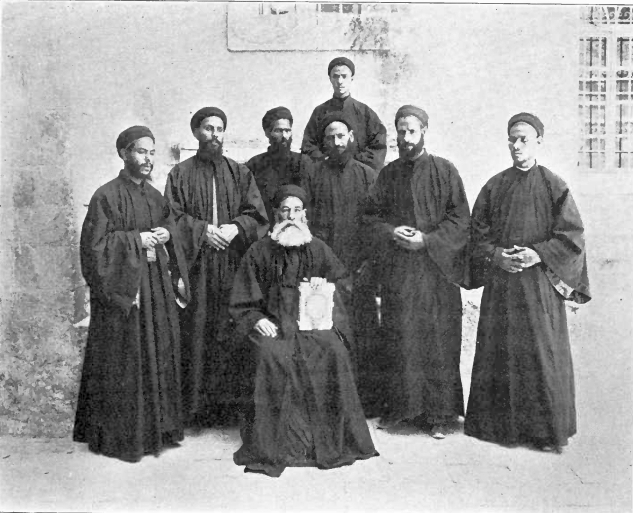
Coptic priests wearing binish coats.

By the turn of the 20th century, upper-class women adopted Western dress. However, middle-class women continued wearing the prototypical women's galabiya, a yoked empire waist gown with a train. Theirs were made of silk or satin, with lots of trim. Those worn at home or under black outer modesty garments were brightly colored. In the second half of the 19th-century, some dancers chose to wear a woman's galabiya instead of the Ottoman derived costume, sometimes with shintiyan and entari. However, many dancers kept the Ottoman derived costume, with a skirt instead of shintiyan. One dance group kept it into the 1970s, with a shorter skirt decorated with tiers of bead fringe and wide ribbons on the belt. Recognizable bedlah emerged in the 1930s.

The yelek was a long caftan with a fitted body and skirts with long slashes that allowed the panels to be tucked upwards and revealed the pants underneath. It had a low neckline and fastened with buttons. It had long sleeves that hung loose from the elbow and revealed the shift underneath. The entari ('antree) was cut the same way, but shorter.

The sedria was worn under the yelek or entari and over the shift. It and the entari were sometimes covered in coins or trimmed with lace ruffles. The dancers entari and sedria ended just under the bust by the mid-19th century, and the entari sometimes had gathered blousy sleeves. They were preferred by dancers over the yelek by that time. Entari and sedria were also commonly worm by poor 19th century women.

The shift adopted from the Ottoman style was knee length, and the sleeves were often edged with lace or embroidery. It was usually white, and made in any fiber except wool. It was sheer. In the 18th and early 19th-century, it was ankle length, but by the 1830s it was knee length. Dancer's shifts in the mid 19th-century were waist length. Poor women often instead wore a blue shirt.

Shintiyan were worn over underpants and made roughly one and a half times the length of the wearer's leg, then folded under and tied at the knee to give a poofed out look. They were made from a variety of fabrics, with patterns and silk being more common for wealthy women and white linen or cotton being more common for poor women. In the mid 19th-century, these were gradually discarded in favor of Western skirts by dancers.

One of the outer garments was the aforementioned tob, thob, sebleh, or tob sebleh, which was a large, loose caftan with very wide sleeves, usually in a black or blue color. A poor woman's might be made of cotton. A wealthier woman's could be cotton with silk stripes, taffeta, or watered silk. Sometimes the wealthy woman's tobs were rose, pink, or violet in color, but a poor woman's was typically blue. Mantles such as the melaya leff were also worn, as were face veils, and the tarha, a scarf worn over the head and down the back. The tarha was of embroidered white muslin, colored crepe with gold embroidery and spangles, or dark blue cotton or linen for poor women. The face veil was black or deep blue, and sometimes decorated with gold or silver pieces, false pearls, coral, and chain tassels.

Prior to the adoption of Western traditions, many Egyptian brides wore many different outfits during the ceremonies. These were more elaborate versions of daily dress; the only example of a specific wedding dress comes from Siwa, where a few tunic designs are specifically worn by brides, though they are also reused as formal dress after the wedding.

In the area around Akhmim in the 1830s, many women wore a hulaleeyeh. This was a length of brown wool pinned like a peplos, with the back brought up to cover the top and back of the head as well.

Most 19th century women wore hip shawls, though the dancers sometimes had jingles. Dancers adopted a distinctive ribbon belt in fabor of these, as well as a girdle made of amulet cases.

19th century women's indoor shoes were typically slippers called mezz, and outdoor shoes were calf length boots called khuff. Baboog were also worn as outdoor shoes. Red or yellow leather called Morocco was typically used for shoes. Some women wore wooden pattens called kabkab or kubkab outside, which were ornamented with mother of pearl and silver. These were worn by both genders in the baths. Socks and stockings were uncommon.

For the past few centuries, sarma embroidery in Egypt has been used for military dress uniforms, wedding dresses, and clerical garments, particularly for Copts and Jews. It typically uses floral, vegetal, and calligraphic motifs. Imitation sirma embroidery is done on machine and used on dresses in the Delta.

Women in the 19th century also wore headresses consisting of a cap and scarves wound around it, which jewelry was hung from. This cap was called a tarboosh, and the scarves were faroodeeyeh. The headdress itself was called a rabtah. Sometimes the front was decorated with spangles of gilt or silver, and the fabric was plain black or rose muslin or cotton. Lower-class women sometimes wore the rabtah, but often wore a simple kerchief tied over the hair.

The mizagee was another common item for women. It was a fillet made of a 5 foot long black or rose colored muslin folded horizontally to the width of a finger or less. The center 12-13 inches were decorated with spangles in diamond or boss patterns. At each end were a similarly decorated 12-13 inches, and an edging and silk tassels. The center sometimes had an edging with spangles. It was tied just above the edge of the rabtah with the decoration centered, and the ends were brought over the shoulders and hung over the chest.

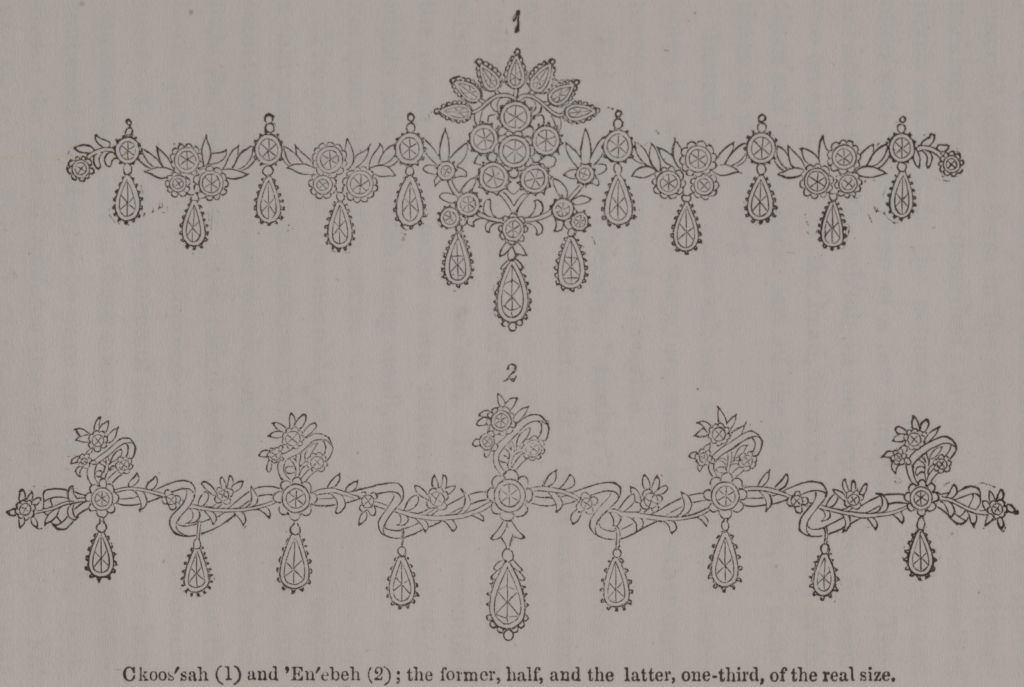
the Kussah and 'En'ebeh, jeweled fillets that attach to the hair or headdress. These are similar to the Algerian Khit errouh.

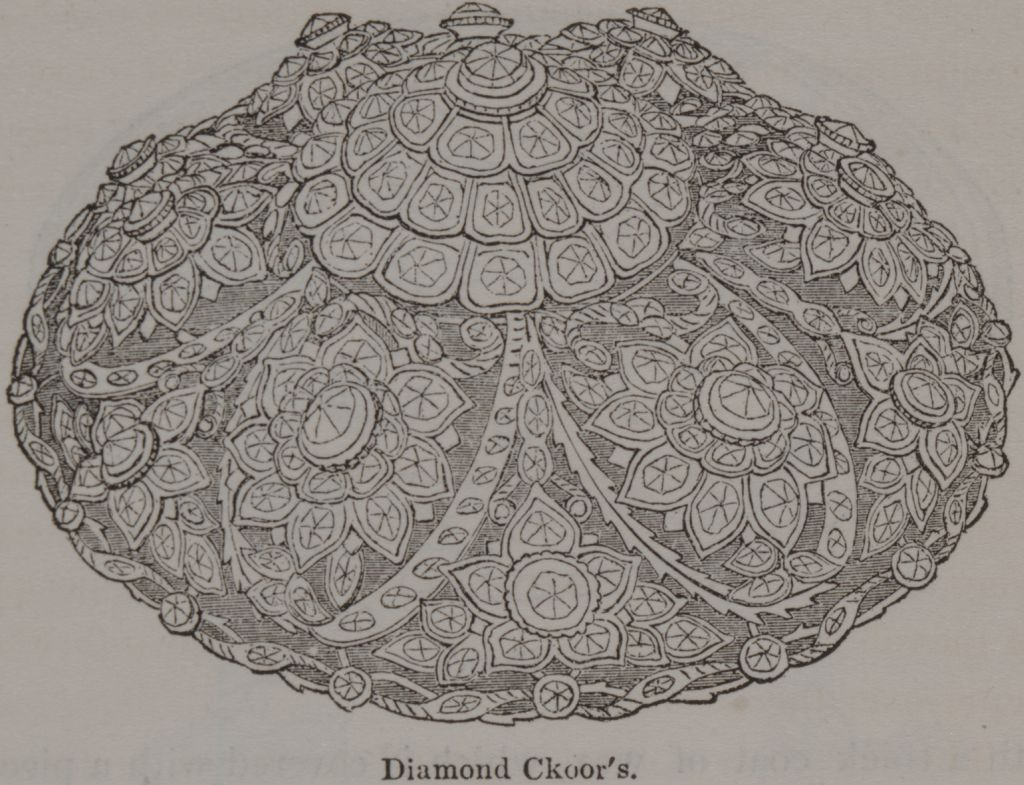
a Diamond kurs, which was attached to the cap in a 19th-century lady's headdress

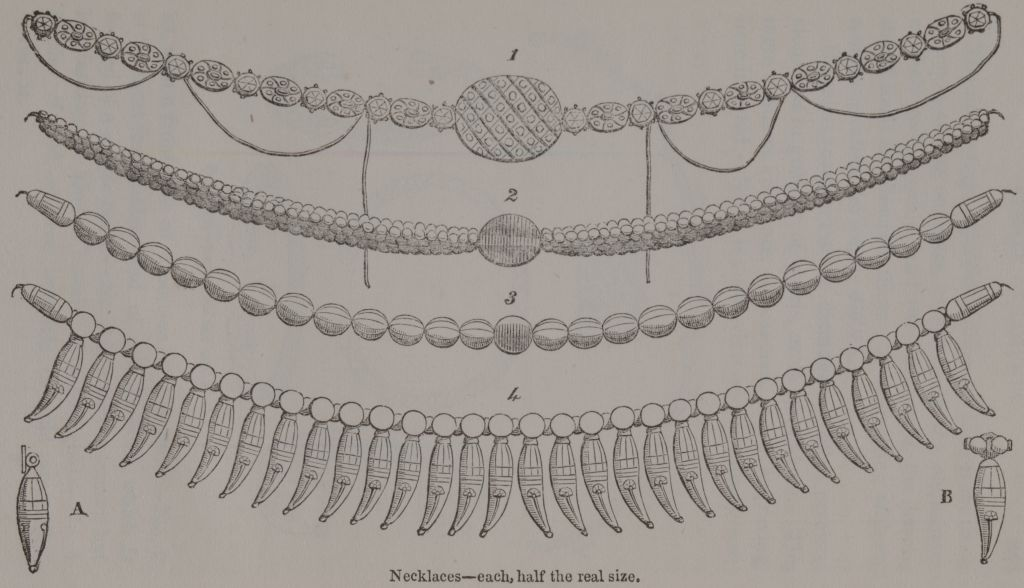
Necklaces common in 1830s Egypt.

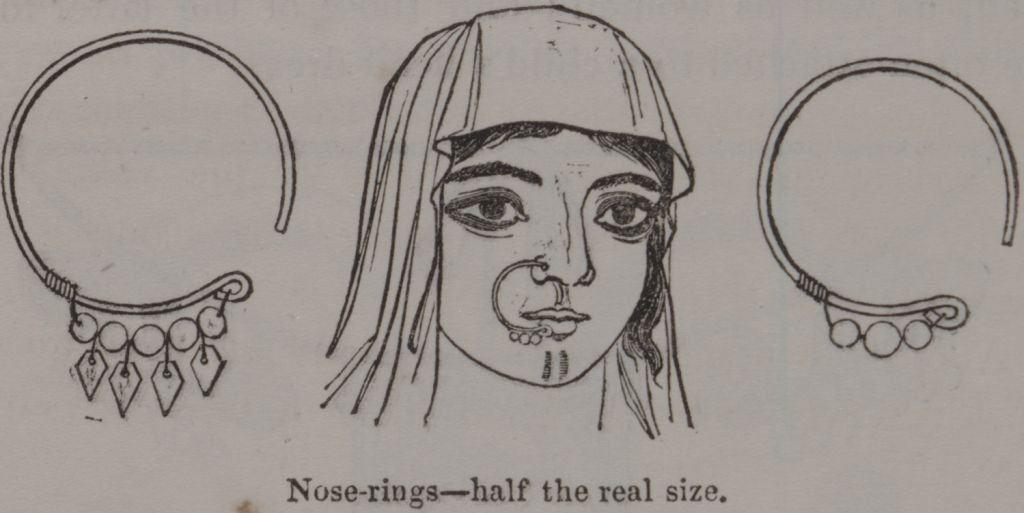
Nose rings, now uncommon in Egypt.

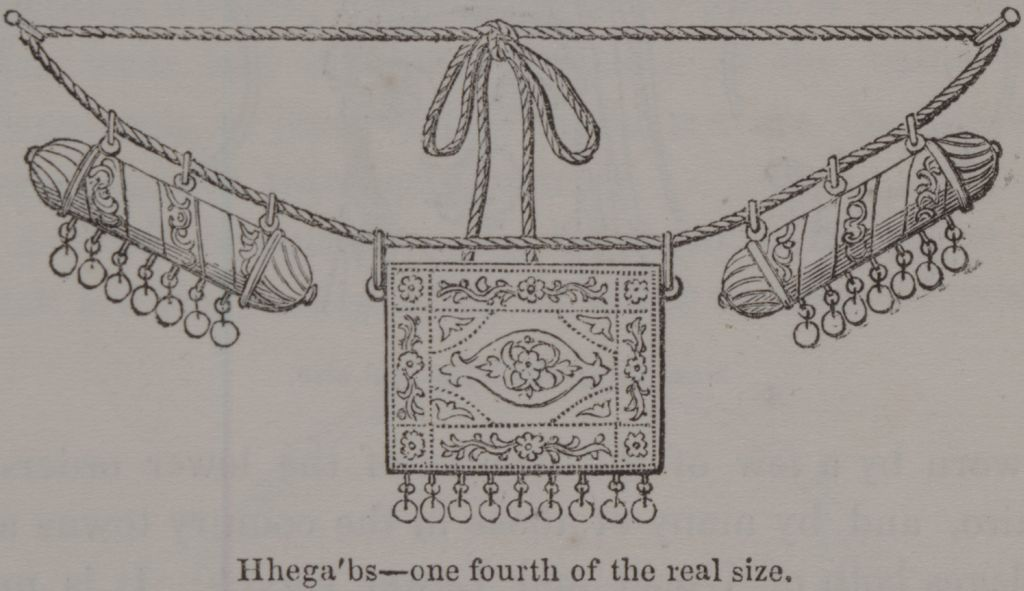
Hegabs or hijabs, amuletic jewelry.

Other fillets made of jewels were popular among the middle and upper classes. The kussah was 7-8 inches long, and made of diamonds, rubies, emeralds, or pearls set in gold or silver. It was worn in front of the rabtah and attached with hooks. The 'en'ebeh was the same, but 14-15 inches long. The shawateh (sing. shateh) was a pair of ornaments made of three strands of pearls, each the length of a kussah, and united by a pierced emerald. Sometimes it was strung in a netted pattern instead of strands, with a few small emeralds sometimes included. It could be attached to the earrings, the front of the rabtah with festoons, or to a kussah's hooks and worn in the back of the headdress. Lower-class women also wore the sheddah benad'kah, a string of Venetian sequins (a type of coin), in the same manner as the kussah or 'en'ebeh.

The kurs are round convex jewelry items, about 5 inches in diameter, sewn to the top of a ladies tarboosh. It was generally worn by upper and middle-class women, but sometimes lower-class women had a gold kurs. The diamond kurs was made of diamonds set in gold, or less commonly silver. It was quite heavy. The gold kurs was a plate of thin embossed gold. It had an emerald or green glass cabochon set in the center. The kurs and kussah worn on the outside of the red bridal shawl, and decorated the bier of a woman. A similar piece called a tepelikler or tepelik is also traditionally worn in Anatolia.

Smaller ornaments hung on the rabtah included the rishi (feather) and hilal (crescent), which were a sprig and crescent of diamonds set in gold or silver and worn in front or to the side of the rabtah. The kamarah (moon) was made of either a thin embossed plate of gold, or gems set in gold. It sometimes had an Arabic inscription, and had 7 pieces of gold called "bark" hanging on the bottom. The sakiyeh (waterwheel) is a circular filigree ornament made of gold with a gem in the center and bark at the bottom. Pearls were sometimes worked into the filigree, and it sometimes had emerald dangles. It is als recognizable today as an earring. The 'ood es-saleeb (wood of the cross) was of Christian origin, but also worn by Muslim women. It consisted of a small piece of wood encased in gold with bark hanging from it. The misht (comb) was a comb made of gold with 5 pieces of gold. It typically was not worn alone. Additionally, gems and glass were sometimes set with a hook and bark and hung from the rabtah.

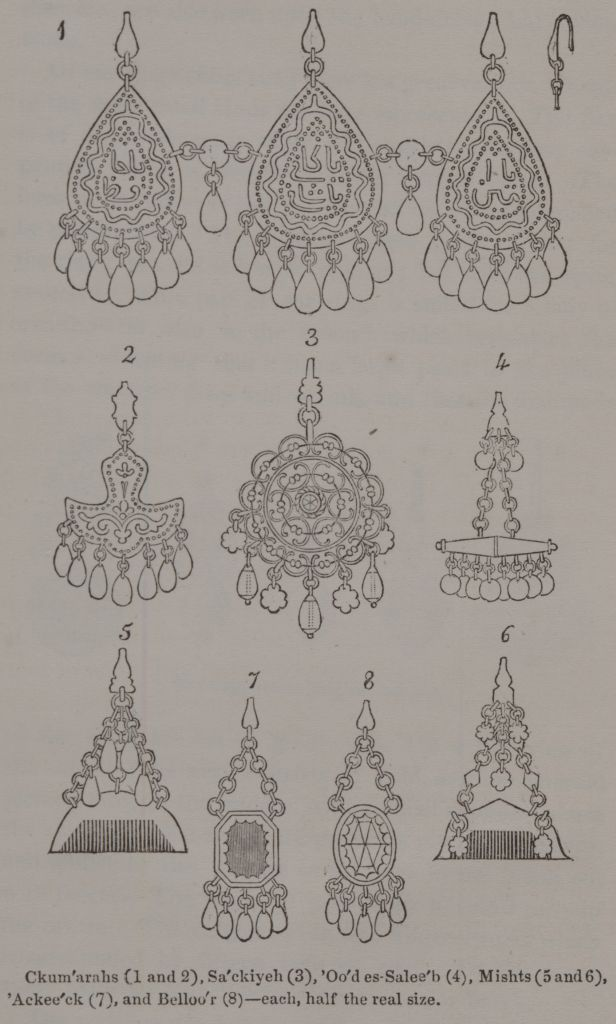
Various ornaments attached to the hair or to a woman's turban or headscarf. 1 and 2 are examples of kamarah ornaments. 3 is a sakiyeh ornament. 4 is an 'ood es-saleeb. 5 and 6 are misht ornaments.

The libbeh and sha'eer (barley) are made of hollow gold beads, and popular among the middle and lower classes. The libbeh has a contrasting focal bead of coral or another semiprecious or precious stone in the center. The sha'eer is also called qurun (horns). The kiladeh was a long necklace that reached the girdle, made of precious stones. A similar necklace was made of gold coins of various kinds. The tók was a ring of silver, brass, pewter, or iron, worn as a necklace.

Anklets (khulkhal) of the 19th century were usually simple and made of solid gold or silver. They were heavy, and would strike each other while walking. Young girls sometimes wore strings of bells as anklets. Bracelets were commonly of gold, glass, brass, or bone.

Gold earrings were common in the 19th century, but many lower-class women wore brass. Silver was uncommon. Some earrings used gems and glass as well.

The common hairstyle of 19th-century women was made of an odd number of tiny braids, somewhere between 11 and 21. The hair around the forehead and temples was usually left loose, and sometimes curled. It was sometimes also braided. Three silk cords per braid were braided in, with gold bark attached along their length. These cords were called ṣafa. Pendants, coins, tassels of pearls, and emerald or coral beads would be attached to the ends of the cords. The braids of cord were also sometimes attached to a silk band and tied around the head to form a braided wig. This hairstyle was initially associated with higher class women, but persisted longer among lower classes, dancers, and Beoduin women. Lower-class women wore a similar hairstyle of two braids with red silk cord mixed in. This style was called 'okoos, and the long cords ended with tassels.

Nearly all 19th century women wore kohl made of resin and smoke black. Different formulas existed and had medical properties attributed to them. It was applied with a slender stick called mirwed. Most women also used henna, in very simple patterns, on the hands, feet, and nails. A mixture of quicklime, smoke black, and linseed oil was applied on top of the henna, sometimes in patterns. This darkened the henna to black or a very dark green. Women also used melted resin to remove body hair.

19th century women in the countryside and villages, and to a lesser extent urban women, had tattoos of a black, blue, or green hue. They were usually on the chin, forehead, hands, feet, chest, and covering the lips. These were called dakk.

Egyptian women's cultural dress is subject to more regional variation than men's. It has three major elements common across the country; a basic dress, an outer modesty garment, and a head covering. The many layers provide modesty, material that can be picked up and folded to carry things in, and protection for dirt, lice, and scratches from plants. Many dresses also have side slits or lower necklines to enable breastfeeding. The looseness of the garments promotes airflow, and the dark color of the outer garments has a negligible increase in heat while worn. Women's dresses are also called galabiya. Dress in the Delta is usually loose with a yoke, but in Middle Upper Egypt women's dresses are typically waisted. Deep Upper Egyptian dresses may be loose or waisted depending on ethnicity. In the Delta, women's dress is distinguished from different parts of it by decorations. Upper Egyptian women are usually differentiated by their modesty covers, which tend to be distinctive. However, headscarf styles now vary so much that this is not always useful to identify a woman.

The dress is usually long sleeved and ankle length, and the garments often use tucks and draping. A woman's best dress is often called a fustan, and it is typically her newest one. Clothes for most serve a variety of purposes and aren't bought for a specific purpose (such as sport, parties, and everyday wear). Most items of folk dress are not ready made. Cotton is one of the most popular materials to make clothes from. A heavier weight cotton for winter clothes, called kustor, was subsidized by the government to ensure an accessible cost to the public for a while. Velvet, silk, satin, smoking (a corded rayon), synthetics, and polyester knits are also used, but more expensive. The typical folk dress takes 4 1/2–5 meters of 80–90 cm wide fabric. Many tailors have a standard dress style they make, with more skilled tailors making variations on it.

The modesty garment is often a local wrapper or mantle that women traditionally wear, such as the melaya leff. These may be ready-made in silk, rayon, or velvet with macramé fringes. Other head coverings and shawls are lengths of fabric cut to size and hemmed, sometimes with added trims of beads or tassels. When it isn't, it is an over dress made of black fabric. In cities this dress is usually of a shiny fabric like silk, rayon, or satin. Among rural people it is usually cotton or wool. Some people, such as Nubians, make it from a black transparent fabric, such as lace.

There are three main style of headcovering for women in Egypt. The sharb is a square kerchief, sometimes with a trim. It is folded into a triangle and tied so it covers the hairline and hair. It is knotted at the back of the neck and again om the forehead. Originally it was placed at the crown of the head, but this now more of a Beoduin or remote village style. The tarha many Egyptian wear is of 2 1/2–3 meters of chiffon or crepe georgette. It may be draped over the head and trail down the back, or wrapped several times around the head from chin to crown, the with tail still hanging down the back. The shawl is another headcovering, made of a two-meter square of fabric. It is of ready made fringed cotton, rayon, or velvet, all heavier weight fabrics. It is not knotted, but folded into a triangle and draped over the head.

The dress of the average and lower class has a high continuity with itself, stretching back into the 19th century. Higher class dress is less continuous and often more influenced by foreign styles. Cross stitch was a typical form of embroidery for clothes all over Egypt up until the early 20th century.

For the average Egyptian, many of their clothes may be sewn at home, by a neighbor, or by a local tailor. Professional tailors are often mem or women who are unwed or widowed, due to social expectations about men as providers. Measurements by tailors are usually taken with their hands or arms as reference, or occasionally objects like floor tiles.

Nose rings were worn into the early 20th century, and were worn as early as the 1830s in Egypt. Most of Egypt at one time in the previous two centuries has or had a traditional nose piercing, regardless of region or ethnicity, with the exception of Siwi Amazigh women. The Upper Egyptian name for a nose ring, khuzam, dates back to at least the 1830s. 19th century nose rings were typically an inch to an inch and a half diameter, made of brass wire, strung with beads, and worn on the right side of the nose.

In Bahariya, the nose piercing is called the gatar or qatrah. It is made from 12 carat gold, never silver, using filigree or granulation. Local women believe a silver piercing would damage the blood vessels in their nose. It is only worn by married women on the left nostril. Traditionally the women of the region believe wearing the nose ring prevents pains and headaches. In Sinai, the nose ring is called a shenaf. It is made of gold with dangles and sometimes colored beads. It resembles Palestinian nose rings. In Nubia, the nose ring is called a zimam. It is worn by Nubians, the Rashayda, and Bishariya. The Rashayda usually have simple nose rings, resembling the 1830s examples. Some women in these regions still wear their nose rings.

Netted bead collars are a not uncommon jewelry item for rural women. The kirdan necklace is also popular, and usually made of gold or imitations.

Amulets in Egypt often take the form of shoes, scorpions, and fish, as well as eyes, turtles, hands, teeth, breasts (in Nubian jewelry), and celestial symbols. Amulets in the shape of swords are also used for pregnant women, as were iron anklets. Other jewelry items were used for children to confound the evil eye. Amulets also often were used medically, such as an earring worn through the upper shell of the ear to cure pain in various parts of the body.

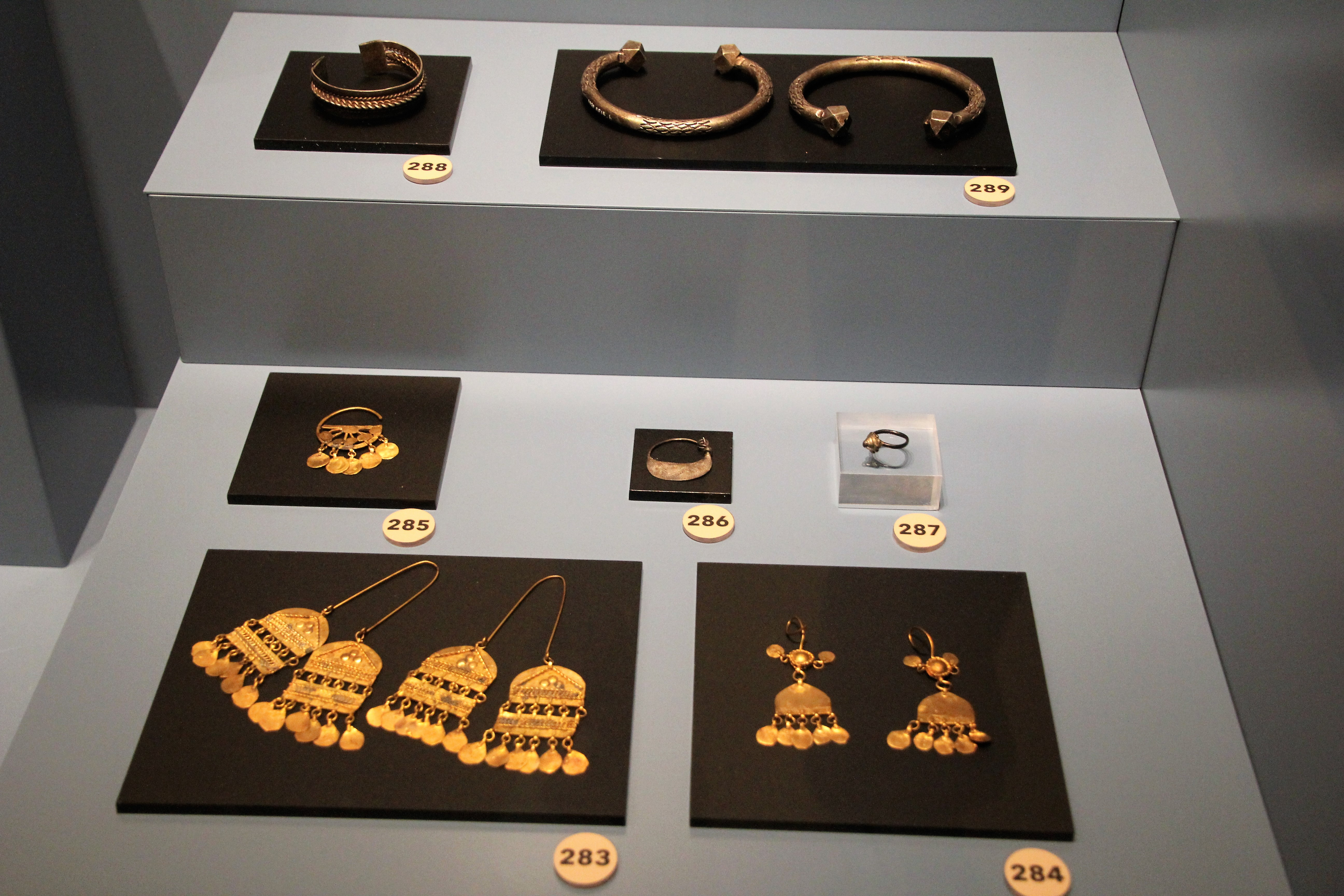
Modern Egyptian earrings

Amulets which are, or are made to look like, containers are also popular, taking the form of small boxes or cylinders, and often called hegab. These made be made of leather or metal and may contain slips of paper with protective formulas written on them, though the metal ones are usually empty. They often have small bells called galagil attached. They may be worn on necklaces, tucked under the arm (with the cord crossing over the left shoulder and the case hanging under the right arm by the hip), or suspended from the head. In Lower Egypt they are often decorated with floral patterns and vertically divided galagil. In Upper Egypt, the patterns are usually geometric with horizontal galagil. Religious inscriptions were also sometimes used on the case itself. Sometimes these were also made with glass beads, with cowrie shells substituted for galagil.

In jewelry making, the use of red and blue forms general trends, with red being more popular in Upper Egypt, the Red Sea Coast, and neighboring Sudan; while blue is more popular in Lower Egypt, Sinai, and neighboring Palestine.

Lower-class women of the 19th and early 20th century often had tattoos, and some men had them as well. These were typically of a blue pigment.

=== Regional and ethnic clothing ===
==== The Delta ====
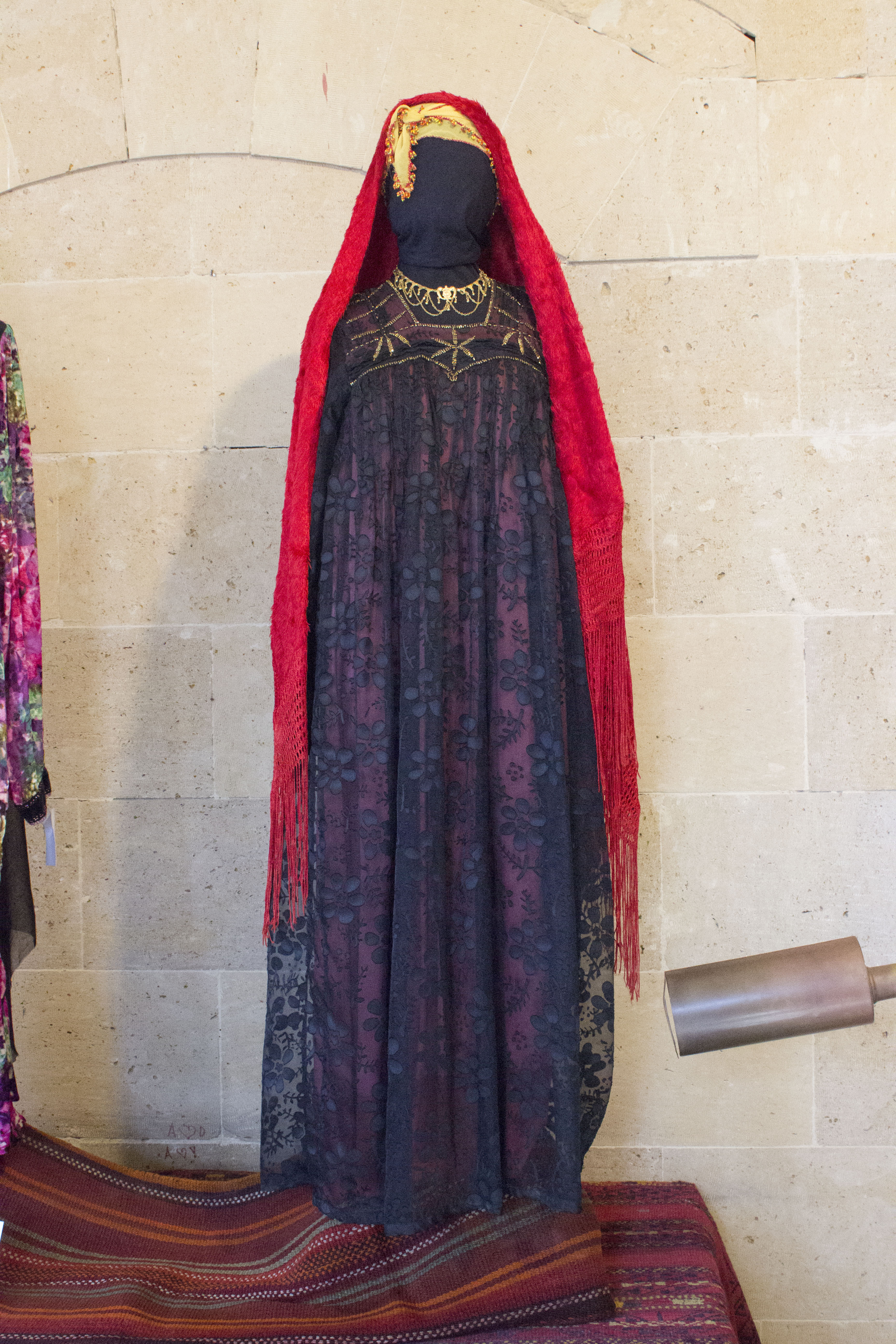
A galabiya bi sufra with machine done sirma imitation embroidery

Several depictions of Egyptian women in blue telli embroidered dresses date to the 1870s. These dresses were likely worn in the Delta before the adoption of the yoked galabiya bi sufra, which was brought on by Western influence. However, most surviving Delta dresses are black, not blue. At least one example of a Delta telli dress made of tulle dates to 1901. A few other tulle bi telli dresses from the Delta of less precise date also exist, as do 1920s photos of wealthy Egyptian women in tulle bi telli dresses. Examples of Delta telli dresses are distinct from Upper Egyptian examples in a few ways: they are more commonly of tulle or mesh base fabric, and the striped motifs are usually smaller diamonds and other shapes, as opposed to the chevrons and descending trefoils of Upper Egyptian dresses. The motifs cover the entirety of the Delta dresses, and the facing on the neck is shaped differently. Additionally, the slit in the neckline of Delta dresses is usually shorter. However, these two motifs do occasionally appear in Delta dresses. Telli dresses have facings on the ends of the sleeves and around the neckline, usually of red or black silk. For the Delta dresses, the facing color may have been chosen to match the color of the dress intended to be worn under the telli dress.

The shift from blue to black started with the wealthy urban Egyptian women of the 1830s, when black was an expensive dye. Over time, new dyes were formulated, allowing black fabric to be made cheaply, and women wanting to emulate the upper-class fashions were increasingly able to do so. Additionally, importing cotton cloth became cheaper than traditional local linen and cotton cloth due to British colonial policy, which financially penalized flax and indigo at the expense of cotton grown for export. This impacted the whole of Egypt. Blue remained most popular for Egyptian men until the 1920s.

Much like how most galabiya bi sufra were patterned after Western fashion, a few surviving Delta telli dresses were modified from their T-shape and made to have an emulation of mutton sleeves, tight chests, and flared hems. One example of a telli dress from the 1930s appears to have been made into a galabiya bi sufra from the beginning.

Traditionally, tailors in the Delta would keep a stock of beads and trims for their dresses. A client would bring the cloth and pay the fee, which was calculated to account for the labor and these trimmings.

Women in Sharqeyya wore a dress malas alongside different village styles, as did women in Behera.

Many women of the Delta wear the sharb alone for their head covering, but some women add on the tarha. It is usually a narrow black rectangle of 2 to 4 meters of lightweight fabric. Some Delta women take lightweight shawls and wrap them into turbans.

==== Middle Egypt ====
In Minya, Beni Suef, and Giza, the outer dress is made of malas. This fabric is similar to seersucker, but with wider stripes, and usually black in color. Initially it was made of silk, but later rayon became popular; this and the discovery of cheaper black dyes made the garment accessible to poorer people. It was commonly made into a rectangular, T shaped dress, with very long sleeves. It was sometimes also worn as a mantle, wrapped around the body. Malas fabric was also popular as formal wear for women in the Delta region. The fabric may be of Coptic origin, with possible artistic representations dating its use before the Islamic Conquest. Silk malas is called malass ḥarīr, while rayon malas is usually called al markib or al ǧazzāzz.

==== Upper Egypt ====
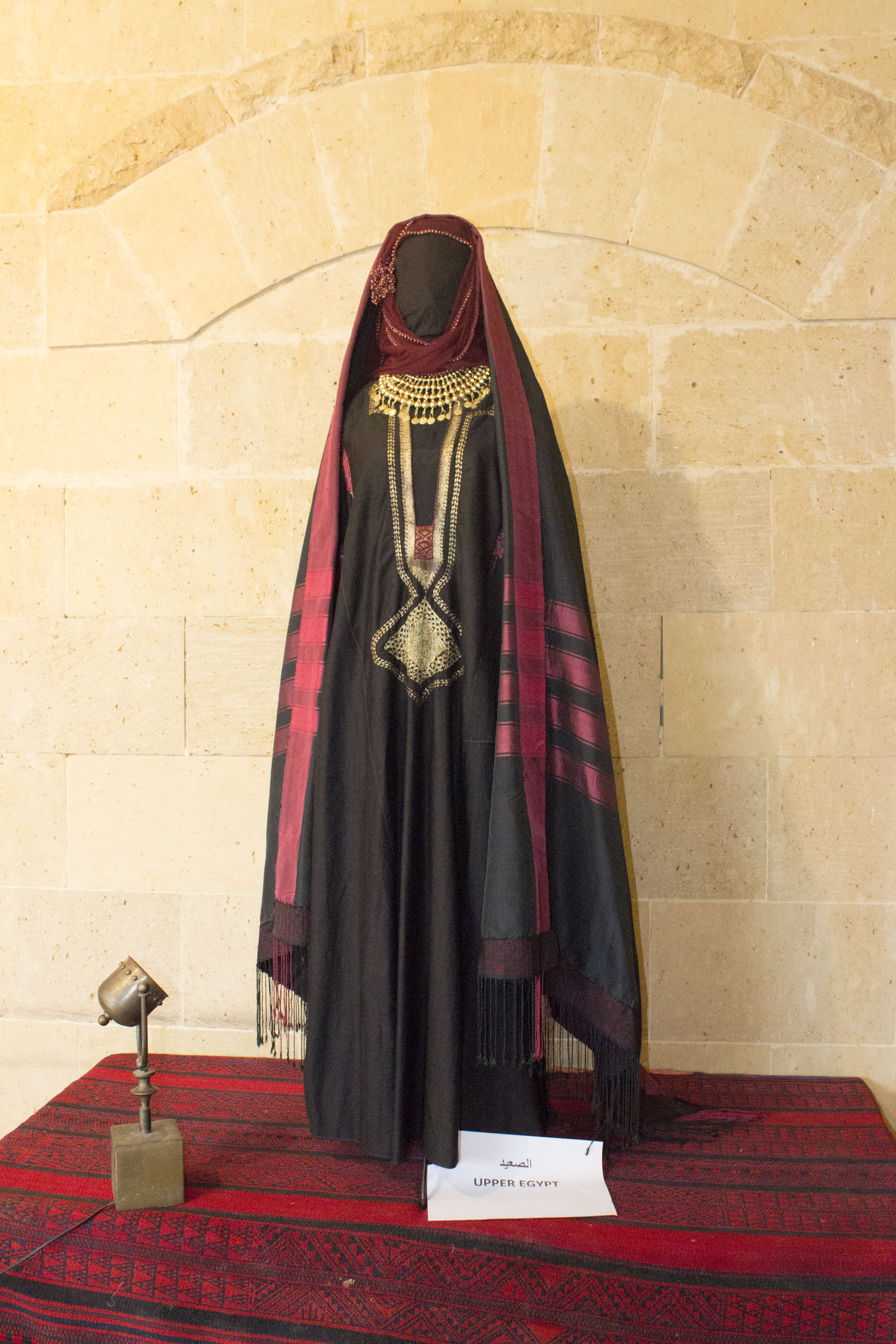
An Upper Egyptian dress with a small amount of telli embroidery

Many traditional Upper Egyptian dresses, especially older styles, were large T shaped robes worn on top of other dresses for public occasions. They have straight seams and very very wide sleeves. They are embroidered along the seams, shoulder, and/or around the neck opening. Traditionally these are often made of black or dark blue cotton. This style of dress is recorded as early as the Description de l’Égypte from the very beginning of the 19th century, and it is the family to which the tob sebleh belongs. From surviving descriptions, over time the sleeves have narrowed, though they are always quite wide. Some dresses are embroidered in only red silk or only telli strips; others a combination of both, though these are less common. The silk over time has been replaced by mercerized cotton embroidery. A dress with dark purple embroidery may indicate the dress of a widow, but these are rare as the convention fell out of use in Upper Egypt quite some time ago.

Alongside the very large tob dresses of Upper Egypt are those that have narrower rectangle sleeves, often with an under arm gusset. Like the previous dress style, the sleeve style has tightened over time. The skirt flares out, making full use of the width of the material. More dramatic flaring became popular as time went on. There are often pockets in the right or left side seam, but usually not both. Earlier dresses may have originally been blue, but most are black. Handwoven cottons, the fabric used in the oldest examples, were replaced by industrial cotton, which was partially replaced by rayon in the mid-19th century. Silk is also used very occasionally. At the bottom the neck slit there may be open work embroidery, which keeps the slit straight and helps protect the fabric from wear and tear. The other embroidery is concentrated on the sleeves, around the neck, and on the seams. These too may be embroidered in red silk, telli strips, or both. A selection of rare examples are connected by three motifs that show up together: trefoils, pyramids, and honeycombs. Dresses of this type only embroidered with telli are the most common of the two. This description is particularly true of the region around Luxor and Aswan.

The embroidery of the preceding dresses commonly framed the seams, with a vertical line in the center top of the sleeves and the center of the dress extending down from the neck slit. Flanking lines of simple embroidery may also be added. The neckline had a thick, usually solid, embroidery, and a secondary frame of embroidery a few inches away that fastened the facing down. The bottom of the neck slit may have a diamond (or three), a square, or a short column of embroidery. From here, a line of descending trefoils may sprout. The shoulders had bands, typically of diamond lattice patterns. From there, a line of descending trefoils may sprout down the sleeves on the center top. Between the neckline and shoulder bands, triangles of embroidery, usually with a diamond pattern, would sit. The common motifs were descending trefoils, crosses, diamonds (which may have originally been stylized crosses), lattices, chevrons, and solid sections of talli. Many of these motifs may be of Coptic origin.

The tarha is part of everyday dress for many Middle Upper Egyptian women. Middle Upper Egyptian women's less casual dress also includes the shawl. The shawl is not exclusively worn in Upper Egypt, but it is more common there.

In Assuit, tulle bi telli cloth is produced and has a special importance, sometimes being called "assuit fabric". It is made of bobbinet and metal or plastic strips. It is used for women's dresses. A similar fabric called tel kirma is made in Turkey, and likely is the predecessor of tulle bi telli. Telli embroidery is used elsewhere in Egypt, and once was used all throughout the Egyptian Nile Valley, especially Upper Egypt. However, many examples were on solid weave fabrics, which are usually cheaper than bobbinet or tulle and more practical for the budgets of local women.

In Bani 'Adi, the traditional dress is a very large T shaped robe of dark blue fabric. The neck opening and seams are embroidered with red cotton or acrylic thread, and additional lines of embroidery decorate the sleeves and sides.

==== Kharga ====
Some of the dresses of Qasr Kharga are similar to Upper Egyptian silk and telli dresses. They are black cotton T shaped dresses with straight sleeves and without a shaped armhole. However, they do not use telli, though they may use coins, and the motifs are composed differently. The Upper Egyptian dresses often have a rectangular border ending in a point that sits a few inches away from the neckline, which fastens the facing down. This motif is scaled up dramatically on Qasr Kharga dresses. The embroidery on these is usually a wide rectangle covering the body panel, made up of most vertical lines of buds, crosses, a simple variation of the descending trefoils, chevrons, honey combs (particularly a triple lobed honeycomb), and various cross stitched rectangles and triangles. The necklines are outlined with a border of embroidery and have a lozenge at the bottom, though this is not a clearly defined diamond, instead being narrower, sometimes even a navette shape. The shoulder bands are usually made of rectangle and square embroidery patterns instead of diamond lattices, and the triangles on the shoulders of Upper Egyptian dresses are absent. From these, descending trefoils may sprout and travel down the sleeve. The embroidery colors are green, orange, and most predominantly, red. The thread is silk.

In Bariz, the dress is of the T shape type, with slightly narrowed sleeves and a small flare to the skirt. It is made of black cotton. The more elaborate embroidered dresses also are mostly embroidered on a center front rectangle, though the major section may stip below the bust instead of going all the way down to the hem. The embroidery on the edge of the neckline is narrower. The body has motifs of descending trefoils, lines of triangles, chevrons, crosses, herringbones, and dashed lines, mostly arranged vertically. These are fewer in number and spaced further apart than the dresses of Qasr Kharga. Coins are sometimes sewn on as decoration. The enlarged neckline frame noted in Qasr Kharga is present, and the point of it extends into a giant diamond, with the horizontal points sitting on the top of the sleeve, and the vertical points mirroring each other on the front and back panels of the dress. This fastens on a lining. The seams are outlined with simple embroidery, and these and the diamond are the only embroidery on the back. The sleeves may have a few additional lines of simple embroidery, which is also seen on Upper Egyptian dresses, as are the seam outlines. The shoulder bands are made of small lines of triangles and diamonds and may have descending trefoils sprouting from them onto the sleeves. The slightly simpler dresses get rid of the diamond extension of the englarged neckline frame, and may get rid of it all together. The embroidery is reduced in complexity, and there is less of it; fewer lines and little to no sleeve decoration. The embroidery that does not outline the seams is likely to stop before the hem. Fewer coins are used as decoration. The simplest embroidered dress has the enlarged neckline frame, and two lines going down from its outer vertical lines, straight to the hem. It also has a narrow border of embroidery on the neckline edge itself. The embroidery colors are green, yellow, orange, pink, and most predominantly, red. The thread is silk or cotton.

Predecessor dresses of the Qasr Kharga and Bariz type were blue tobs with fully embroidered center panels. The colors for embroidery thread are much the same, as are the motifs, but the lines are more densely packed, and there is some embroidery on the lower back panel. The neck is outlined, and a heart shaped lozenge made of three diamonds sits at the end of the neck slit. A horizontal band divides the front panel a few inches up from the hem, and a slightly different embroidery pattern is done on either side. The shoulder band stays, with very short descending trefoils and lines of motif sprouting out to only the upper arm. These became wide sleeved black dresses, with narrower sleeve and body panels. Some of these predecessors have a slight train. Some are black and some are blue.

In Genah, the dress is black, with a flared T shape. The sleeves are narrow. Like in Bariz, the englarged frame is sometimes continued into a diamond shape that fastens a facing down. When it isn't, the usual enlarged frame holds down the lining as it does on Upper Egyptian examples. The front body panel is embroidered over the breast in horizontal lines with a few short vertical descending trefoils at the bottom, and there are descending trefoils on the sleeves. The rest of the dress has vertical stripes of herringbone embroidery, including on the back and side panels. These are usually one color, but may be segments of two colors. The embroidery motifs are descending trefoils, crosses, lines of diamonds and triangles, diamond lattices, and zigzags. The shoulder bands are made up of square, triangle, and diamond embroidery patterns. The embroidery colors include orange, purple, green, white, yellow, and red.

Dresses in Kharga typically have a large bead and a loop sewn at the top of neckline slit to close the dress. The use of lighter accent colors in Kharga dresses may be imitating the look of telli embroidery. .

==== Dakhla ====
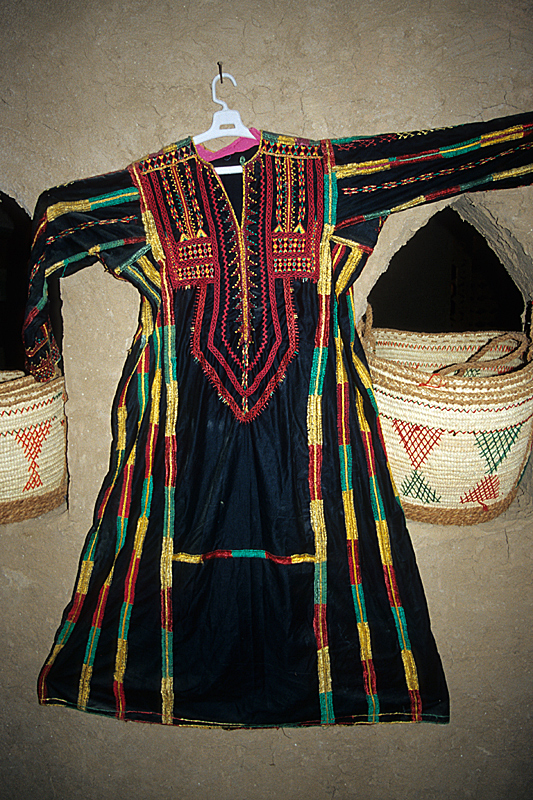
A dress from the Dakhla Oasis.

In Balat and Bashandi, there are two dresses. One is a flared T shaped dress of black cotton with narrow sleeves. The other has a straight yoke that stops before the bustline. Dresses embroidered with cotton are for daily wear, and silk is formal. The cotton embroidered dresses are resold for cheaper as well by locals, and have seam pockets that are uncommon on silk examples. More coins are used and laid in solid rows or shapes, and the same number is used on both the formal and informal dresses. The unyoked dress has embroidery and coins going down past the navel in a T shape with a pointed end, while the yoke is the main area of embroidery on the other. This embroidery is mostly vertical lines of diamonds and honeycombs. Both have a border of embroidery around the neckline and shoulder bands of diamond, triangle, or square patterns. Both have vertically oriented lines of herringbone embroidery called gadīlas on the sleeves, side panels, and the lower back half of the back center panel. These are more tightly packed together than the stripes of Kharga dresses. On the cotton dresses they are monochrome, but on silks they have a center "ridge". The center top sleeve stripe is flanked by descending trefoils in a diamond variation. Other small embroideries may be put between the herringbone stripes. The upper front embroidery is of linked diamonds in red or purple, with blue and orange accents. The sleeve cuffs have cross stitched triangular embroidery. A heavily embroidered section also sits on the back center panel's lower half of both dress styles; above the stripes is a horiziontal stripe of geometric patterns, a thin strip of linked diamonds, and this is topped by another row of geometric medallions. Similar vertical stripes of geometric embroidery sit between the lower back stripes below it. Buttons may also be sewn on the chest as decoration, as well as to fasten the dress at the top of the slit. The unyoked dress has two short columns of coins at the either side if the top of the neck slit. It also either has a pentagon of coins at the bottom of the pointed T of embroidery, or a vertical line in the center front, or outlining the lines of embroidery on the lower half. The yoked dress has a placket in the front that closes with hidden snaps. Usually the bottom of the yoke and sometimes the neckline have a line of buttons sewn down as decoration. This may be as many as three rows on the bottom. Under the yoke is a row or two of coins. Small slits may be put on each side of the yoke to allow for access while breastfeeding; the yoked dresses were specifically used by nursing mothers. The motifs are descending trefoils in a diamond variation (descending "sprays"), stylized flowers, diamonds, herringbone stripes, triangles, honeycombs. The colors are a predominant red (casual) or purple (formal) with accents of yellow, pink, white, beige, blue, and orange.

The stripes used in Balat and Bashandi are similar to that of the Greek sigúni of Hassia.

An older predecessor to the dresses of Balat and Bashandi is an unflared T shape with wider sleeves and a much wider body. Originally these were straight, but some surviving examples were modified with an angled seam to narrow the sleeves at the cut. It has the vertical herringbone stripes, pointed T shape chest embroidery, embroidery on the lower back center panel, and coins on the chest. It also has the descending sprays which are a variant of the descending trefoils found in Upper Egyptian dresses.

An interesting oddity is a dress of this predecessor type, but with telli embroidery added around the neckline and a lozenge at the bottom of the slit, and pyramids with descending sprays on the upper arm. There are also narrow telli stripes between the herringbone stripes on this example.

In Al Musheyya, the dress is a flared T shape of black cotton with narrow sleeves, a round neckline and a slit. The embroidery borders the neckline and extends several inches past the point in a center line, forms a pointed T shape (which is a bit narrower and shorter than Balat and Bashandi), another border between the two lines, the seams, and further decorative lines. It does not have shoulder bands. Over time the point on the end of the T has warped and become a curve. The embroidery is less dense than the dresses of Balat and Bashandi, and is overall vertically oriented. A bead and loop are placed at the top of the slit to fasten it. The coins are not as densely sewn on than Balat and Bashandi, and are not always used, perhaps due to Al Musheyya being a poorer community. The motifs are lines of honeycombs, linked diamonds, lines of triangles or spikes, zig zags, thin straight lines, stylized flowers. The colors are predominantly red, pink, or purple, and have accents of pink, green, blue, orange. The old mourning dress, which has not been used in a long time, was predominantly green, as red was not appropriate for the occasion; it was associated with the pleasures of life.

In Al Gadida, the dress is a black flared T dress of black cotton with narrow sleeves. Older dresses were once made of blue fabric. The embroidery is similar to Al Musheyya, but the chest has vertical columns in the wing area, and echoed lines in the point area. There are shoulder bands of diamond patterns. Herringbone stripes are predominant, whereas Al Musheyya is predominantly stripes of honeycombs. It also has the bead and loop closure on the neckline. The embroidery motifs are herringbones, honeycombs, linked diamonds, diamonds, and zig zags. The embroidery color is predominantly red or fuchsia, with accents of green. Like in Al Musheyya, a mourning dress of predominantly green embroidery once was in use. The embroidery tends to be monochrome with small uses of accent colors.

The predecessors of the Al Gadida dresses include a dress of the same general shape and embroidery, but with no flare to the body. Along with the more common recent embroidery, there was also a lozenge at the bottom the neck slit and stylized trees, descending sprays on the back shoulder, stylized fish, stylized flowers, and crosses. A horizontal band sits about halfway down on the back panel, and connected to the vertical seam frames in a U shape. Pinks, yellows, and greens were once used. Another garment with tantalizing similarities is a pagan era garment excavated from Dush in Kharga, which has some compositional parallels.

The use of lighter accent colors in Dakhla dresses may be imitating the look of telli embroidery.

==== Bahariya ====
The different types of dresses in Bahariya include the Magaddil ("braided"), a black cotton T shaped flared dress with a vertical stripe composition similar to the gadīla pattern of Dakhla. It has wide stripes along the seams, as well as additional parallel accent stripes on the side panels and sleeves. The back and side panels have a horizontal stripe 2/3 of the way down the dress. Additional vertical stripes are added below this horizontal stripe, between the stripes that continue up the dress, with a third addition of vertical stripes on the back panel. All of these are made of large lines of triangles on either side of a center herringbone stripe. The stripe is one color; the triangles may be in multicolor sections. There are shoulder bands of triangle and linked diamond patterns. There is a T shaped panel on the chest ornamented with coins to outline different sections. It is filled with triangular, linked diamond, and zigzag embroidery patterns. The bottom of the T and the tops of the sleeves have a few tufts of fringe. The latter may be connected to triangles on the upper arm. Another, much wider line of diamonds or a "braid" may extend front the bottom of the T shape to the hem of the dress. There is a button and loop closure at the neckline. The embroidery motifs include triangles, linked diamonds, diamonds, herringbone stripes, an oval and seed pattern, zigzags, and diagonally striped columns. Older Magaddils are more extensively embroidered and very little of the black base fabric is visible. The Magaddil has been in use since the 1920s and may be related to the dresses of Kharga. It is also similar to a "robe d’alme en soie rouge” from the Description de l’Égypte, though the dress was not exclusively worn by alme (dancers), and the pattern may have been a common pattern in urban Egyptian dress before it was pushed out of use by the adoption of Ottoman fashions.

The embroidery colors in Bahariya are more varied than the other Oases. They include red, fuchsia, pink, purple, deep blue, green, orange, and yellow. Mourning dresses with deep violet embroidery were once in use. Thread was cotton or silk depending on what one could afford. Rayon is used on later dresses to replace silk, and acrylic was also sometimes used. Everyday dresses used yellow cotton embroidery, and usually were more simply embroidered.

A few Bahariya dresses have telli embroidery, but it is not as common. It usually was an insert placed around the neckline, creating a border and ending in a lozenge. Dresses with it had less embroidery, and it was even used for floral print dresses. Dresses of extensive telli embroidery were imported, likely from cities in the Delta, for wealthy brides in the early 20th century. Coins may be a cheaper, less labor-intensive substitute for telli embroidery in Bahariya.

Traditional headdresses include a black cloth with a pink border. These and traditional jewelry were worn longer than the traditional dresses of the region by younger generations, which were replaced by more generic flower print dresses.

Women in the Bahariya region traditionally cut their hair to have straight edged bangs.

The coin decorations of all the Oasis' dresses are similar to the pláka, jordáni, and dickey of Attica, Eleusis or Atalandi in Greece.

==== Farafra ====
Farafra's dresses are black galabiya bi sufra. One style has a round neckline, a square yoke, and button fastener in the back. The skirt and sleeves are gathered, and the skirt has a ruffle at the bottom. The neckline, yoke, sleeve cuffs, and top of the ruffle are outlined in red cloth trim. Simple embroidery of cross stitched triangles may decorate the yoke. These are arranged in horizontal lines. Alternatively, a line of triangles following the edge of the yoke may be done in red trim, with echoed lines of the border trim. A few coins may be sewn to the yoke edge. The embroidery is mostly red, with accents of white, green, and yellow. While this dress resembles the Delta dresses, the African origins of many in Fafara indicates it may actually be related to Nubian dresses. A photo of a galabiya bi sufra worn by a Black woman with Nubian jewelry and buttons sewn on in a similar pattern to the Fafara dress potentially supports this.

==== Siwa ====
Siwi girls traditionally braid their hair. There are different styles for wed and unwed women. The common traditional headcovering is called terku’et. The terfutet intihikiki was a special headcovering for mourning worn with the ashsherreḥ nazitaf.

Married women's tunics in Siwa traditionally often have square necklines, while unmarried girls have a slit neckline, which has a towq tiltcha or Tiltchewayn. This is a black inset with multicolored embroidery. The embroidery design varies a bit, but it usually has lines dividing the fabric along its length and a square or semi circle at the point. Stem and herringbone stitches are used in green, orange, red. Small crosses, linked diamonds, starbursts, triangles, squares, and chevrons are used. The design may have originally been a sun motif. If so, it may be evidence for the idea that Christianity and the Amun-Ra cult once coexisted in Siwa. It may sometimes have decorative mother of pearl buttons sewn on, and the front and back are sometimes embroidered differently.

The square necked tunics are decorated with ṭowq teltawayn, a black inset embroidered with green silk and accents of red, yellow, or orange. It uses herringbone stitches. The embroidery on it is asymmetric, and generally stays the same on different tunics with minor variations.

The unmarried girls often wore striped or black tunics without trousers underneath, and boys would wear similar tunic with black sleeves. The side panels of girl's tunics sometimes had both striped and black fabric, with black sleeves.

The wedding tunic was once the tiddī roumyy. This was replaced by the tiddī liḥrīr in the early 20th century, and the ikbīr nuwase' replaced that in the mid-20th century. Bridal tunics are layered on top of each other; one old combination is as follows. A white nattiyak tunic as the base layer, a red tunic, a black tunic, a yellow tunic, and a blue tunic, topped by a red silk tunic and a green silk tunic, then a heavily embroidered tunic. These last three were probably liḥrīr likbīr.

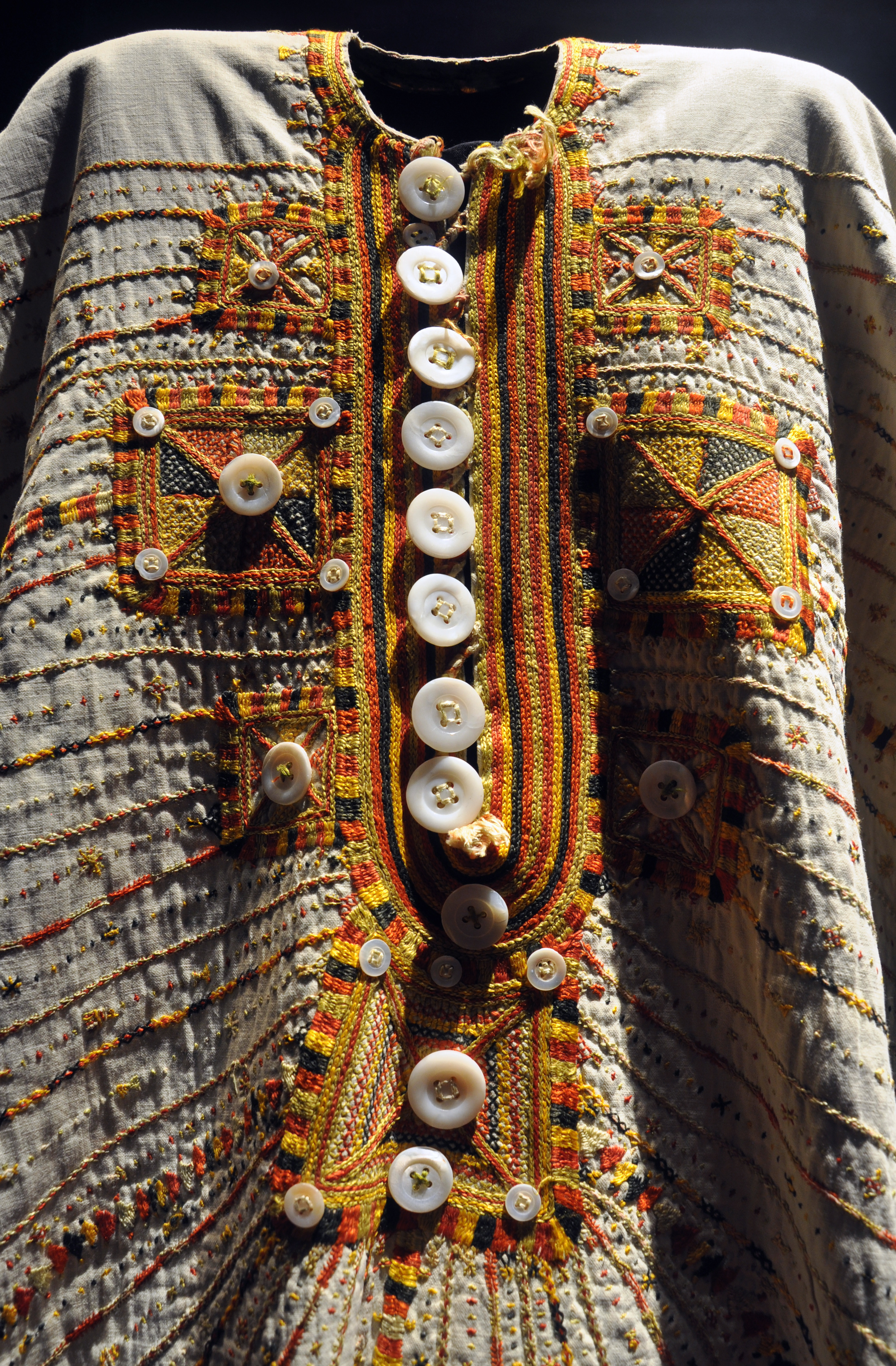
The front embroidery of an ashsherrẹh naminal, also called an asherah nahuak.

The ashsherreḥ naminal is a white embroidered tunic, often worn by brides and young wives on special occasions. Initially it was worn on the 3rd day after the wedding, during a ceremony where her family visited and ceremonially washed he feet. Her husband's unwed sisters also sometimes wore it to the wedding. The white color is incredibly unusual in formal Egyptian traditional dress. The fabric can be made of any fiber, and any pattern so long as it is fully white can be used. The neckline is embroidered with the ḥātem (seal) motif, a square divided into triangles. Legateen, long braids ornamented with mother of pearl, cowries, and tassels, decorate either side of the neck opening. The embroidery section around the neckline is called Ṭowqatayn. The embroidery is in orange, green, red, yellow and black in a radial pattern across the front panel. The neckline is framed with embroidery, and on either side of the neck slit are three hatem. A seventh hatem sits at the bottom of the neck slit. Buttons are interspersed throughout the embroidery as decoration. Late 20th century dresses introduced new colors, plastic sequins, rhinestones, and other decorative novelties. Some have letshinab nagel ilḥirīr, striped fabric insets, and some have black fabric insets. It is not worn after one has had children.

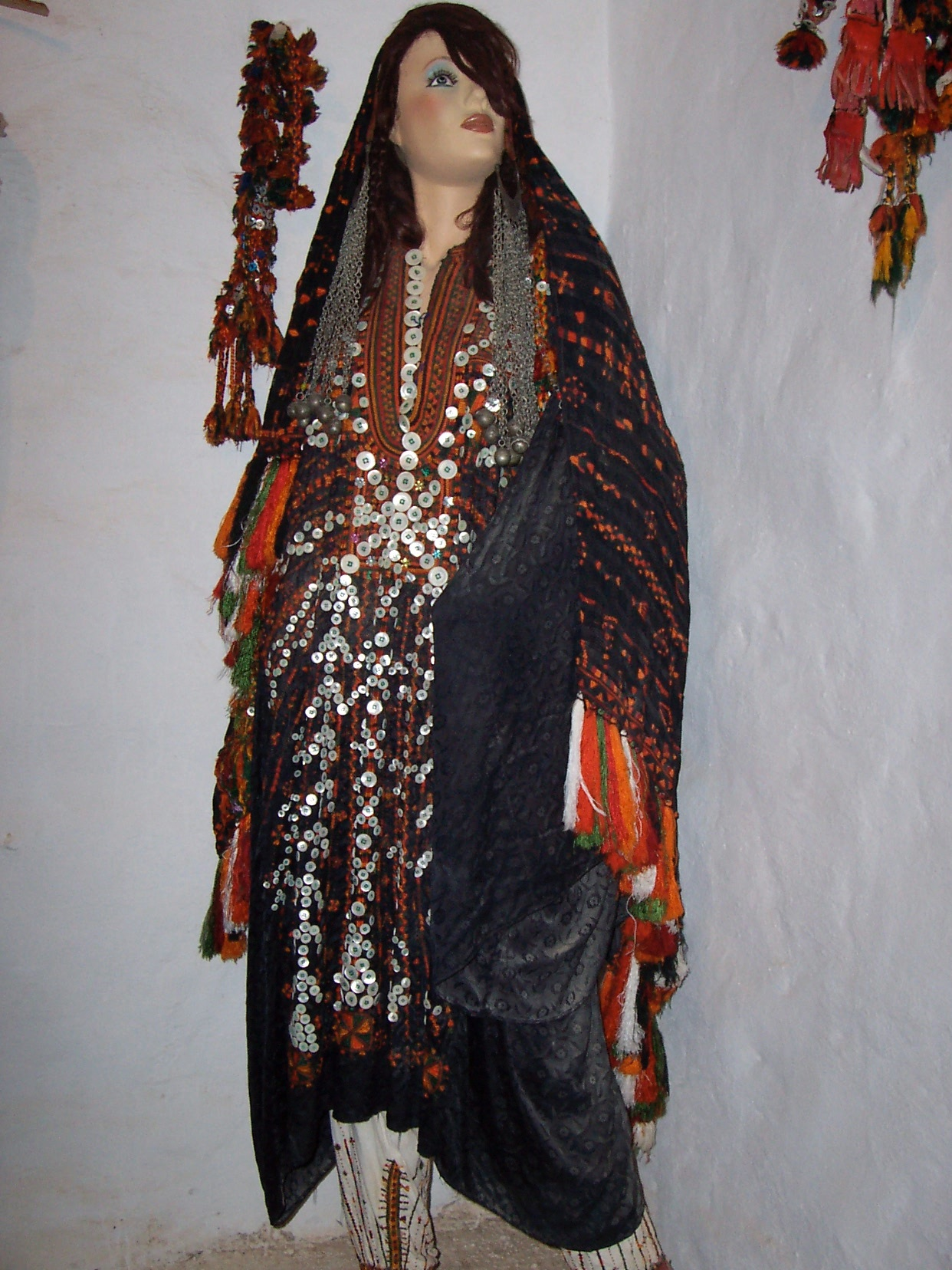
An ashsherrẹh nazitaf, also called an asherah nahuak, with the traditional bridal headcovering, and with srwalayn ḥātem underneath.

The ashsherreḥ nazitaf is the same tunic, made of black fabric. This fabric sometimes has monotone black on black stripes. It is worn as formal wear by married women regardless of if they've had children, starting on the seventh day after the wedding for a reception ceremony. The legateen on these is usually sewn on to the body, while on the former dress they are sewn to snaps, allowing them to be easily removed. It is less popular than the former dress, as it does not match the imported white wedding dress standard. It is less commonly sold second hand as it was also worn for longer periods of time in a woman's life. It also called the ashsherreḥ hawak azdhaf. Later ashsherreḥ nahuwak use smaller buttons in larger numbers, and have longer hems. The buttons along the slit were accompanied by loops of cord on the opposite side, and were functional. This functionality was replaced by snaps. The embroidery also increases in length towards the hem, and develops a curved look instead of the straightness of earlier radial lines. Other Egyptians call these "the dress of a thousand buttons" (ṯūb al alf zurār) due to the many mother of pearl buttons sewn on as decoration. These buttons are called eyes of the sun (tut in tfukt), and are believed to transfer the energy of the sun to the wearer. Originally these were likely a kind of mother of pearl sequin that was gradually replaced by more accessible buttons. Occasionally coins were used in addition to the buttons. In Siwa, both dresses can be called ashsherreḥ nahuwak collectively. The necklines of these tunics are often round with a slit, in a break with the usual necklines used in Siwa. Bright ashsherreḥ in colors like pink and blue were also briefly popular in the mid-20th century. Miniature versions are also sometimes made for young girls in recent times.

The liblaq is an older style garment, resembling the naminal but with black sleeves and side panels. It is sometimes worn instead of the naminal. The embroidery is less elaborate, but it is considered a luxury garment. It uses fewer mother of pearl buttons. It also has the ḥātem motif at the bottom of the neckline, and the neckline embroidery section is called a Ṭowqatayn. Dresses of a very similar style with a maidens neckline also exist, as do even smaller tunics for little girls, with simpler embroidery or reused panels.

The everyday dress of married women in the mid-20th century was called ikbīr nuwase'. It is made of brightly colored sheer rayon, patterned rayon, or polyester. It has small black insets on either side of the center panel, stretching from the bottom of the sleeve to the hem. They sometimes have small inserts of striped cotton fabric, the letshinab nagel ilḥirīr. The liḥrīr likbīr are tunics made in sets of three, one deep green, one deep reddish purple, and one deep blue. They are worn in top of each other, and these are on top of at least 5 other tunics. They are made of handmade striped silk, in the same pattern as the fabric of the letshinab nagel ilḥirīr. The fabrics have an uneven texture from the weaving process, and are of a set width that makes them patterned much the same way each time. Each dress uses around 18 meters of 22 cm wide fabric. They have the towq teltawayn embroidered at the neck. These are another older style once worn by wealthy brides, and are extremely rare to find today. Many of these dresses were reused by multiple brides. A similar tunic of red striped fabric exists from the 19th century, in the wider sleeved tob sebleh style.

The srwalayn ḥātem are a type of white cotton sirwal worn by married women. A bride would have at least 7 in her trousseau, as married women were expected to wear these every day. There are ḥātem motifs on the ankles, vertical lines of embroidery with crosses and suns on the sides of the legs, and elaborate tassels on the drawstring (called a dekket). The embroidery colors are black, red, orange, yellow, and green.

The tiddī liḥrīr is a tunic with a handwoven striped front panel, and black rayon sleeves and sides. It was everyday wear for early 20th century women. The fabric is dark blue or green with red, yellow, orange, or white stripes, and was made in Kirdasa, though it stopped being produced there by the end of the 20th century. The fabric was also exported to Libya, and sometimes was embellished with telli motifs woven in, in a star pattern, combs, perpendicular stripes, or a passenger train. This fabric was also used for the letshinab nagel ilḥirīr.

The tiddī roumyy is a knee length tunic with a handwoven front panel striped in two shades of blue, and black rayon or velvet sleeves and side panels. This rayon may have a monochrome striped pattern. It has a ṭowq teltawayn. It was also daily wear for early to mid 20th century women. The tunic may have originally been made entirely of striped fabric. Sometimes the side panels have an inset called letshinab nagel ilḥirīr, which is a red, black and white striped handwoven fabric from Kirdasa. This may have had an amuletic significance. Over time the length of the tunic has gotten longer. A similar tob of two tone blue stripes was also worn by urban Egyptian women in the mid 19th-century, though it was made of wool instead of cotton.

The embroidery motifs in Siwa include the hatem (which may have originally been a cross motif) which is a square or circle divided into 4 sections, the hamsa/furs, crosses, sunbursts, net stitches, triangles, diamonds, stylized spiders (possibly a sun variant), stylized flowers (possibly a sun variant), and fish.

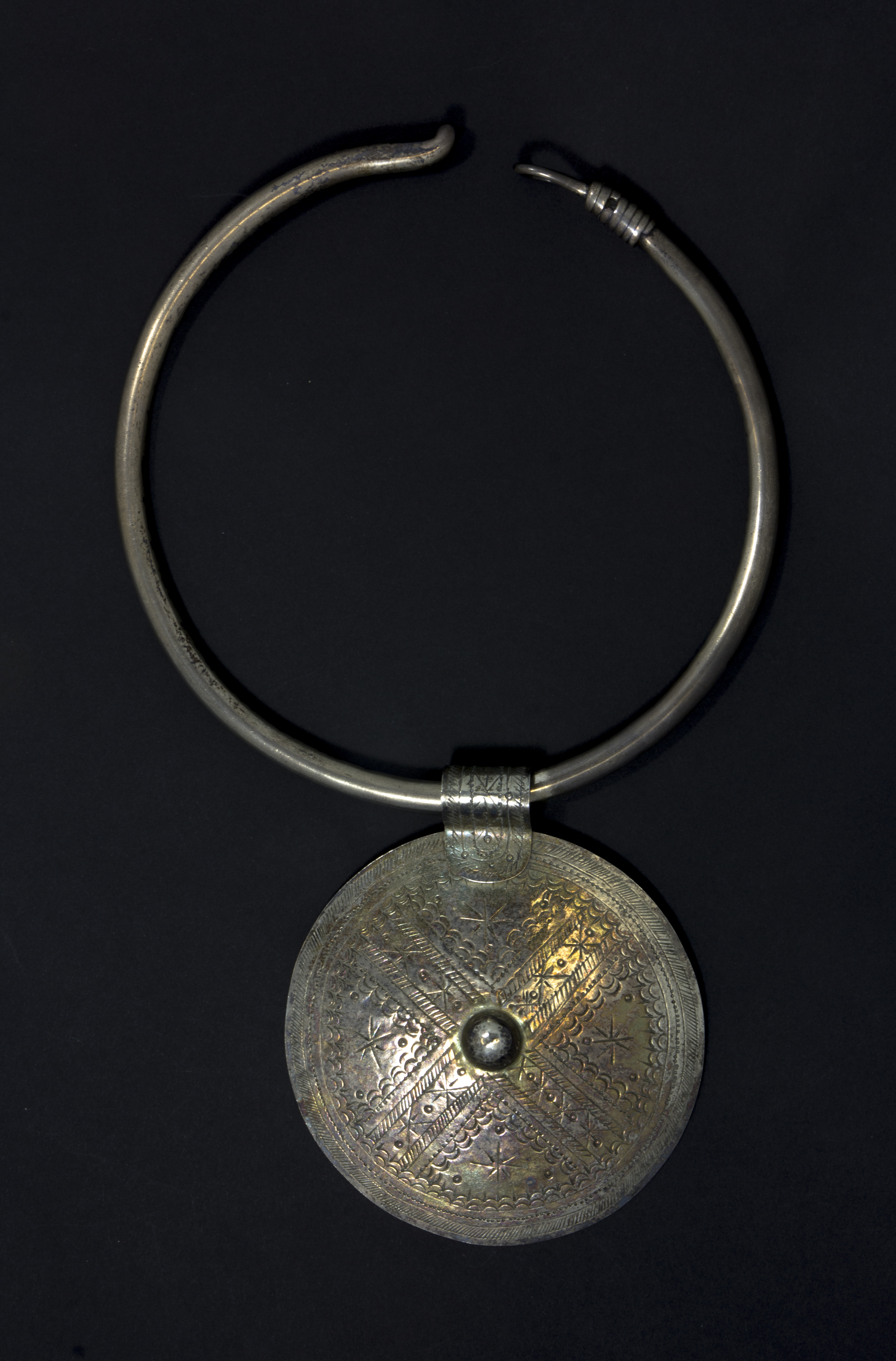
A necklace traditionally worn by unmarried girls in Siwa

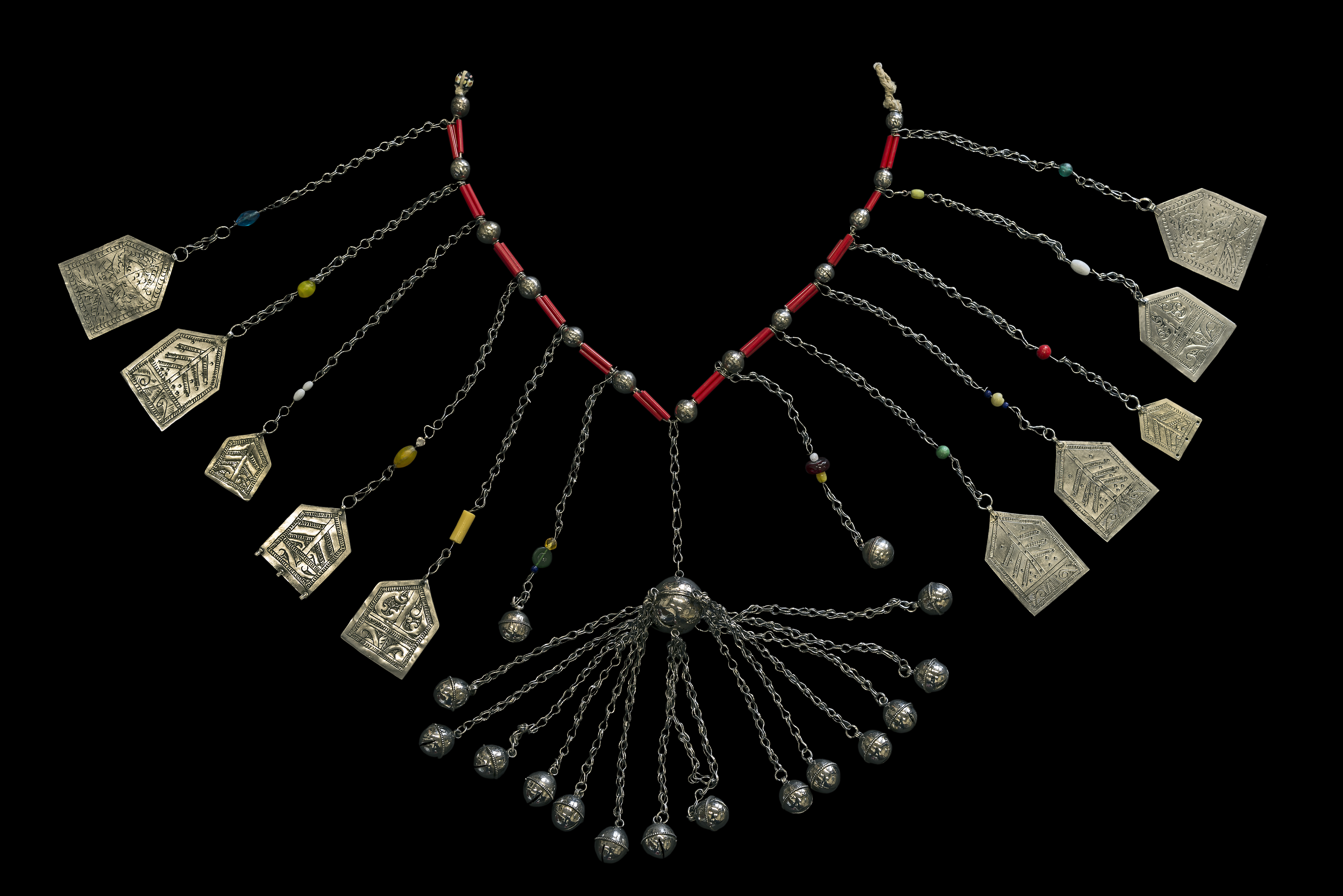
Another traditional necklace from Siwa

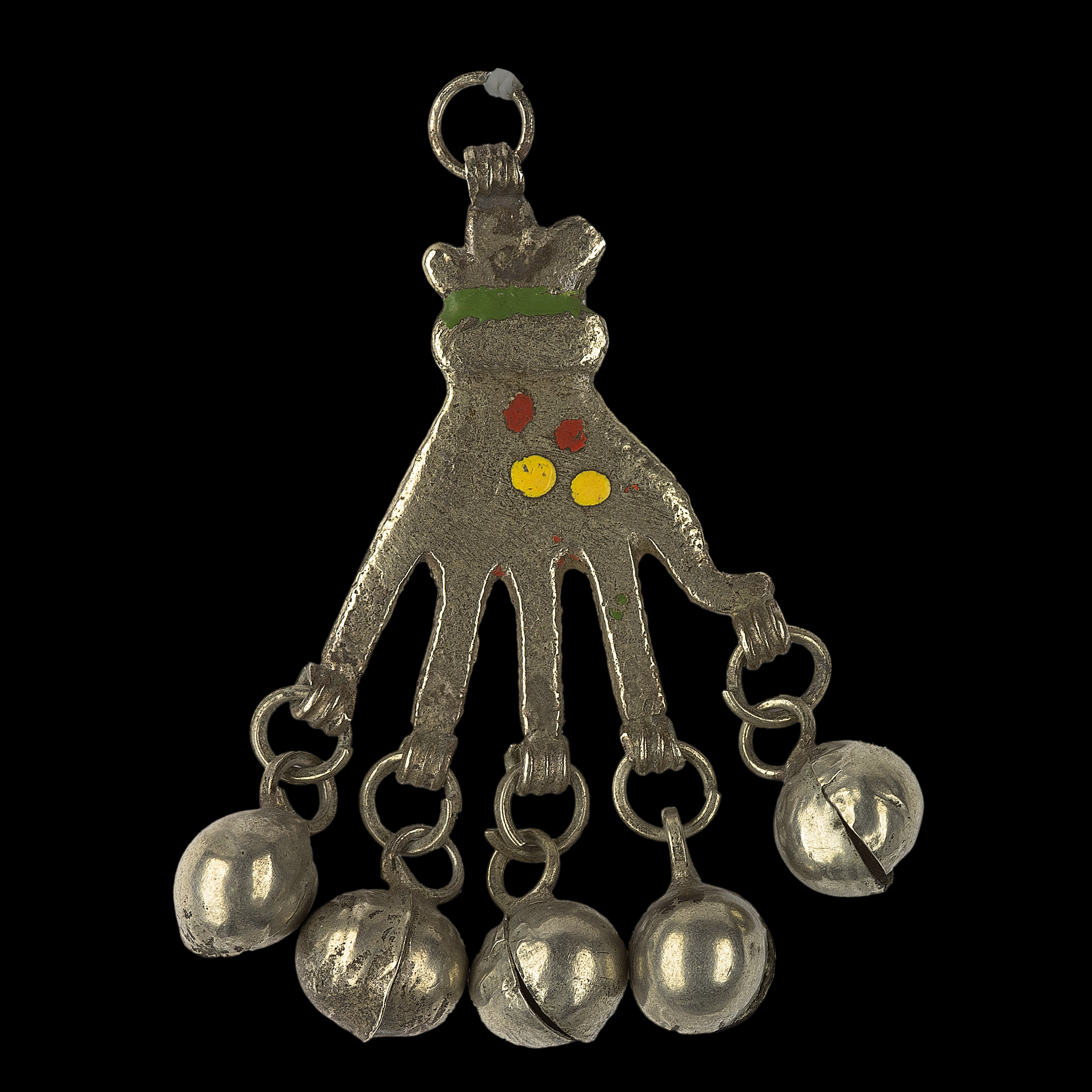
a Siwi hand of Fatima amulet

Higabs in the shape of tubular amulet cases and hands of Fatima are sometimes attached to tunics for brides and children.

==== Nubians ====
Nubian Egyptian women either wear a sari-like garment called a shugga over a modest dress if they are Kunuz, or a long loose dress with a train called a girgar if they are Fadiga. The Girgar is made of sheer black cloth, these days commonly of black lace. In the early 20th century it was a very loose and simple garment, resembling the tob sebleh. The train was created by the neck opening being set slightly pas the halfway point, making the back hem longer than the front when worn. A generation later, it came to resemble the girgar most know today: a dress with a yoke, with the skirt and sleeves gathered down to it, pintucks in the skirt, and a ruffle on the hem and the end of the sleeves. However, this garment was not typically made of lace yet, and the sleeves were rectangles, not set in with a curved sleeve head and armhole. A generation later, black lace and curved sleeve setting came into use. The most recent version typically also lacks a train and has a wider bottom ruffle. A possible intermediary between the first and second generations is that of a girgar with a plain back, and a front with a yoke and tucks.

Before the girgar, Fadiga women wore full sirwal and a shawl, leaving the chest partially exposed. Similarly, in the very early 20th century and the 19th century, Kunuz women wore the shugga without a dress underneath. This changed likeky due to the increased presence of Westerners. Nubians girls often wore the rahat, a leather belt with long fringes covering the upper thigh, and not much else. The rahat is still worn in some wedding ceremonies, on top of a dress, and is also generally well known to Sudanese women.

== See also ==
- Galabiya
- Melaya leff
- Tarboosh
- Tulle-bi-telli
