= Dina (belly dancer) =

Egyptian belly dancer and actress

- دينا
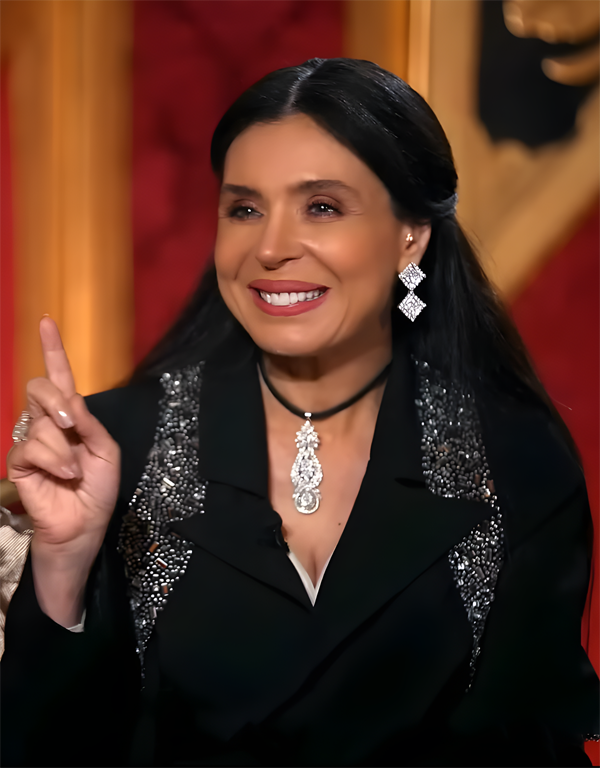
- Born: Dina Talaat Sayed Muhammad; April 12, 1964 (age 62); Rome, Italy
- Education: Ain Shams University
- Occupations: Belly dancer, actress
- Years active: 1985–present (dancer); 1987–present (actress)
- Spouses: unknown (div. 1998) Sameh El Bagoury (m. 1998; died 2001) Hossam Abol Fotouh (m. 2001; div. 2009) Wael Abo Hussein (m. 2011)
- Children: Ali El Bagoury
- Parent: Talaat Sayed Muhammad (father)

Dina Talaat Sayed Muhammad (Arabic: دينا طلعت سيد محمد, IPA: [ˈdiːnæ ˈtˤɑlʕɑt ˈsæjjed mæˈħæmmæd]; born 12 April 1964) is an Egyptian belly dancer and actress. She was named as the "Last Egyptian Dancer" by the American magazine Newsweek. She has a master's degree in Philosophy.

== Personal life ==
Dina was born in Rome, Italy and her origins are from Upper Egypt. Her father was correspondent for the Middle East News Agency in Rome. At age 16, Dina became depressed after her fiancé committed suicide and she attempted to kill herself. She earned a master's degree in philosophy from Ain Shams University at the insistence of her father. She has a sister, Rita, who was a professional singer in the 1980s before retiring and deciding to wear the niqab. Her first marriage ended in divorce in 1998. She then married director Sameh El Bagoury, the father of her son Ali. After El Bagoury's death from a brain tumour in 2001, she secretly married Hossam Abol Fotouh. It was rumored that she would retire, but she returned to her career.

== Career ==
Dina started her career in the early 1970s with the Reda Dance Troupe. She became a solo dancer in the 1980s and soon became well known. In the 1990s she became known for her gigs at hotels like the Cairo Sheraton where she shocked Egyptian society by eschewing the traditional bellydance costume for shorts and a bikini. Like most belly dancers, Dina dances for private functions as well as public engagements. As of 2007, she charged around E£7,000 to appear at weddings. She has travelled to various countries to teach workshops and perform, including Brazil in 2005 and Australia in 2010.

In 2011, she released her autobiography, Huriati Fi Al Raqs (My Freedom in Dancing). Because of the 2011 Egyptian revolution it did not sell well in Egypt, but the French-language edition Ma liberté de danser (2011) was more successful.

== Filmography ==
=== Cinema ===
- El-Kammasha (1987)
- En-Nasib Maktoub (1987)
- El-Hubb Aydan Yamoot (1988)
- Ginan fi Ginan (1990)
- Al-Ghashim (1991)
- Albaree wa al-Gallad (1991)
- Esteqalet Gaber (1992)
- Mazbahet al-Shorafaa (1992)
- Demo Sahebat Al-Galala (1992)
- Al-Mansi (1993) - Guest of Honour
- Qshr el-Bondoq (1995)
- Estakoza (1996)
- Ibn Ezz (2001)
- Alaya el-Tarab bet-Talata (2007)
- Elbelyatsho (2007)
- Maganin Nos Kom (2007)
- Ezbet Adam (2009)
- Had Sama' Haga? (2009)
- Wlad Al Balad (2010)
- 'Asl Eswad (2010)
- Shari' Al Haram (2011)
- Foukak Mini (2011)
- 'Abda Mota (2012)
- 'Ash al-Balbal (2013)

=== Television ===
- Rodda Qalbi (1998)
- Fereska (2004)
- Raya Wi Sekeena (2007)
- Romanet el-Mizan (2008)
- Al Ashrar (2009)
- Samasim (2009)
- Zahra Bareyya (2009)
- Khas Gedan (2009)
- Waad Mesh Maktoub (2009)
- Qeshta We Asal (2013)
- Ahl al-Hawa (2013)
- Faraoun (2013)
- "Al-Harbaieh" (2017)
- "The Flood / El Tofan" (2017)
- "Rahim" (2018)

=== Theatre ===
- Alabanda (1995)

=== Bibliography ===
- Dina Talaat, Ma liberté de danser: la dernière danseuse d'Égypte (My Freedom to Dance), Michel Lafon, January 2011 ISBN 9782749913629
