= Badlah =

Traditional Egyptian folklore costume

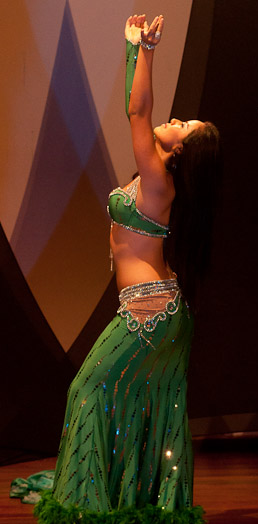
A common bedlah costume

The Bedlah or Badlah is a belly dance costume and attire normally worn by women. The word bedlah is Arabic for "suit".

In the world of belly dance and raqs sharqi the term bedlah refers simply to the costume that a dancer wears. Most commonly it is used to refer to the matched set of bra and belt that cabaret dancers use, but technically it encompasses all parts of the dancer's costume as well, such as the jewelry, headband, skirt, pants and veil. This is often referred to as a Complete Bedlah. Occasionally it also refers to just one piece of the costume such as the highly ornate belt that tribal dancers wear which may or may not have a matching bra. The term Bedlah hardwear refers to the sturdier portions of the dancer's costume, the bra, belt and jewelry, and the term Bedlah softwear includes the flowing fabric portions of the costume, the skirt, pants, vest, choli and/or veil. Bedlah originated in the Western imagination of Victorian painters and was adopted by dancers who catered to foreign audiences who expected the look. Many dancers also adopted the look simply because they liked it, and it has survived to become the most popular costume for Middle Eastern–style dancers across the globe.
