= Melaya leff =

Egyptian garment

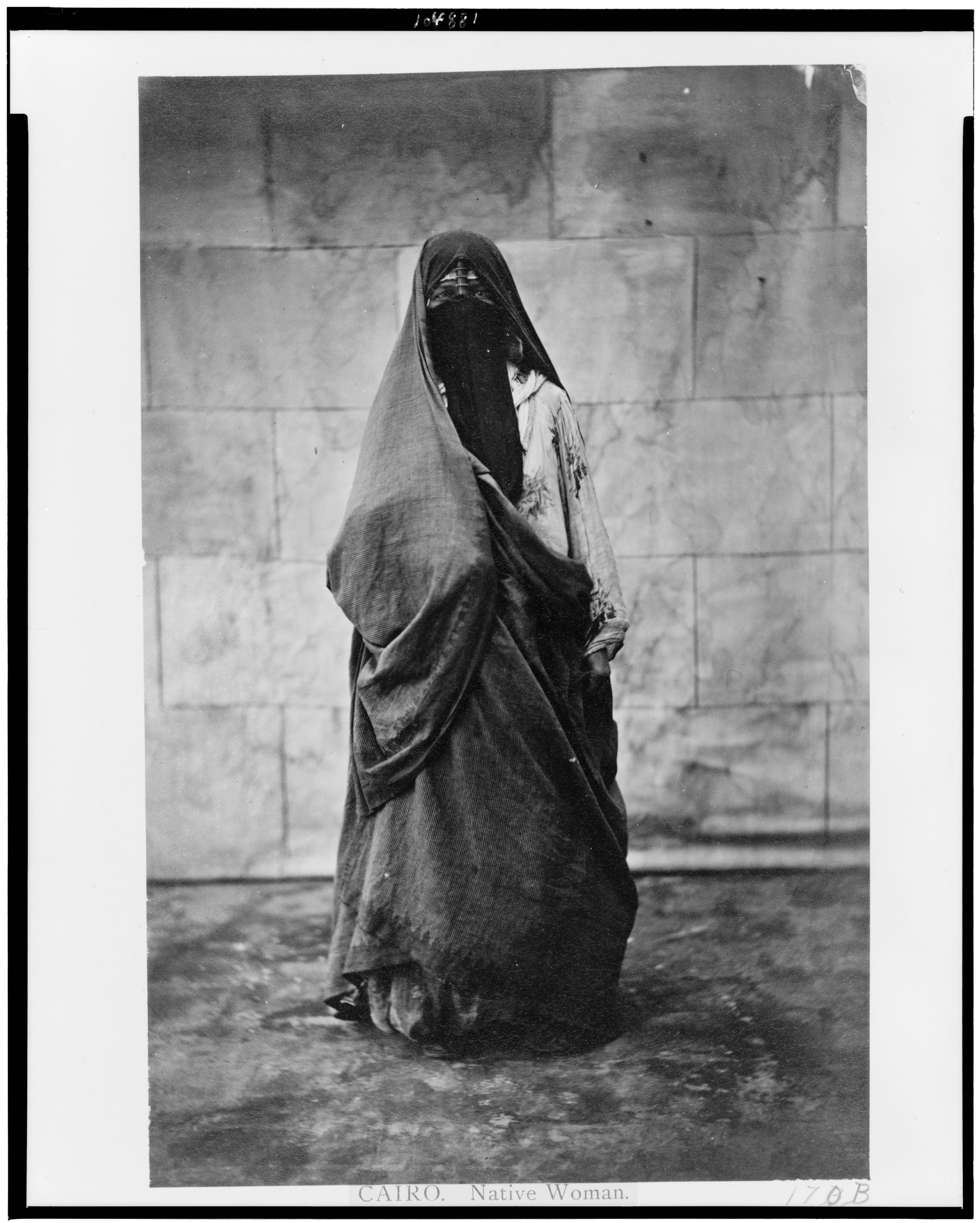
Photo of a woman from Cairo wearing a melaya.

The melaya leff (meaning "wrapping sheet") is a mantle commonly worn in Egypt until the late 20th century, originally worn as a modesty garment throughout the major cities of Egypt. Today it is frequently worn as part of dance costume and used as a prop during performances. It is an example of Egyptian cultural dress.

== History ==
A type of mantle worn by women (and men) and wrapped around the body can be seen in art dating back to the Ptolemaic era in Egypt. Such garments were found in many ancient Mediterranean and Near Eastern cultures such as the himation, palla, and more.

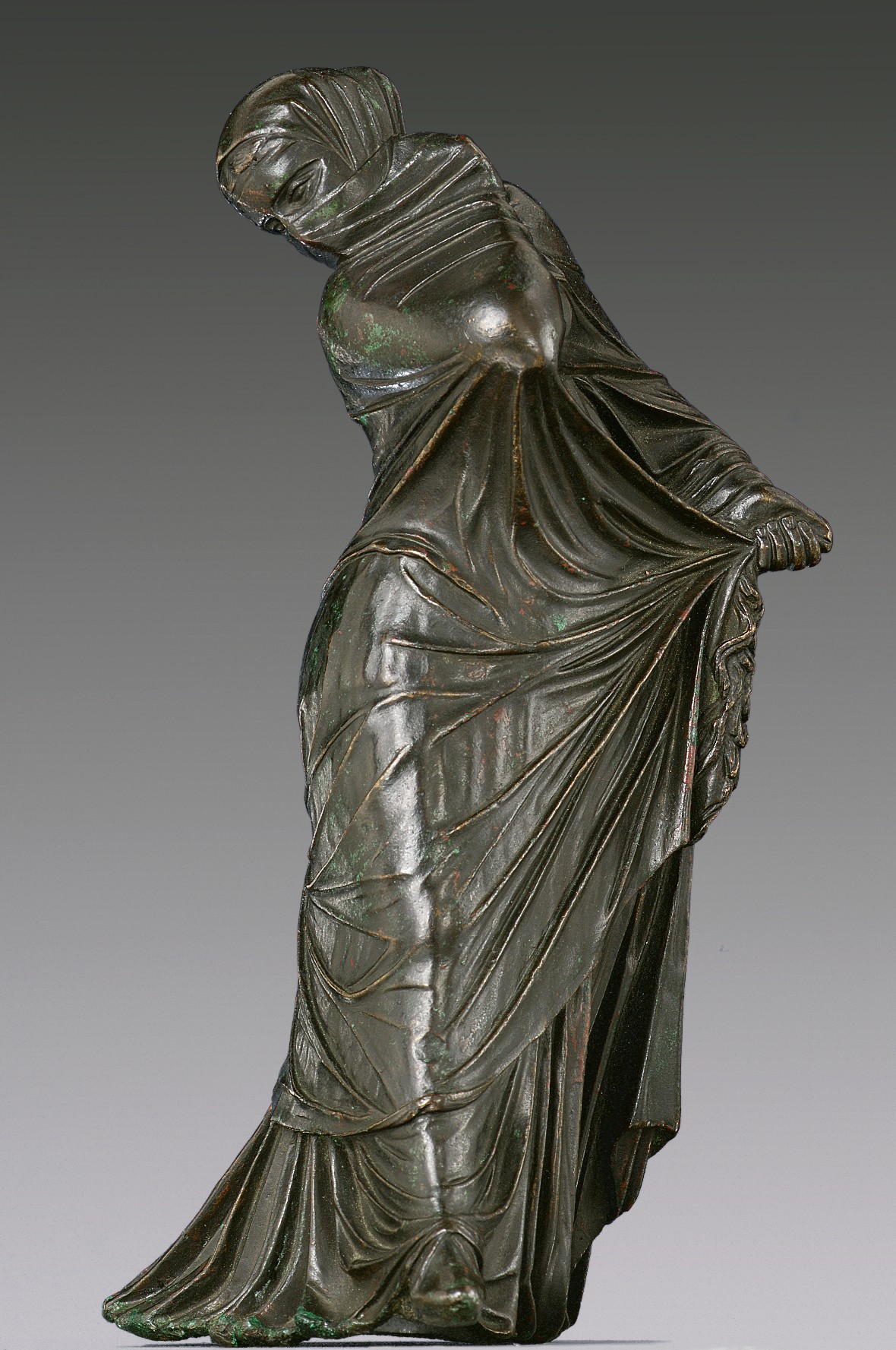
Bronze statuette of a dancer from Alexandria, made 3rd-2nd century BCE

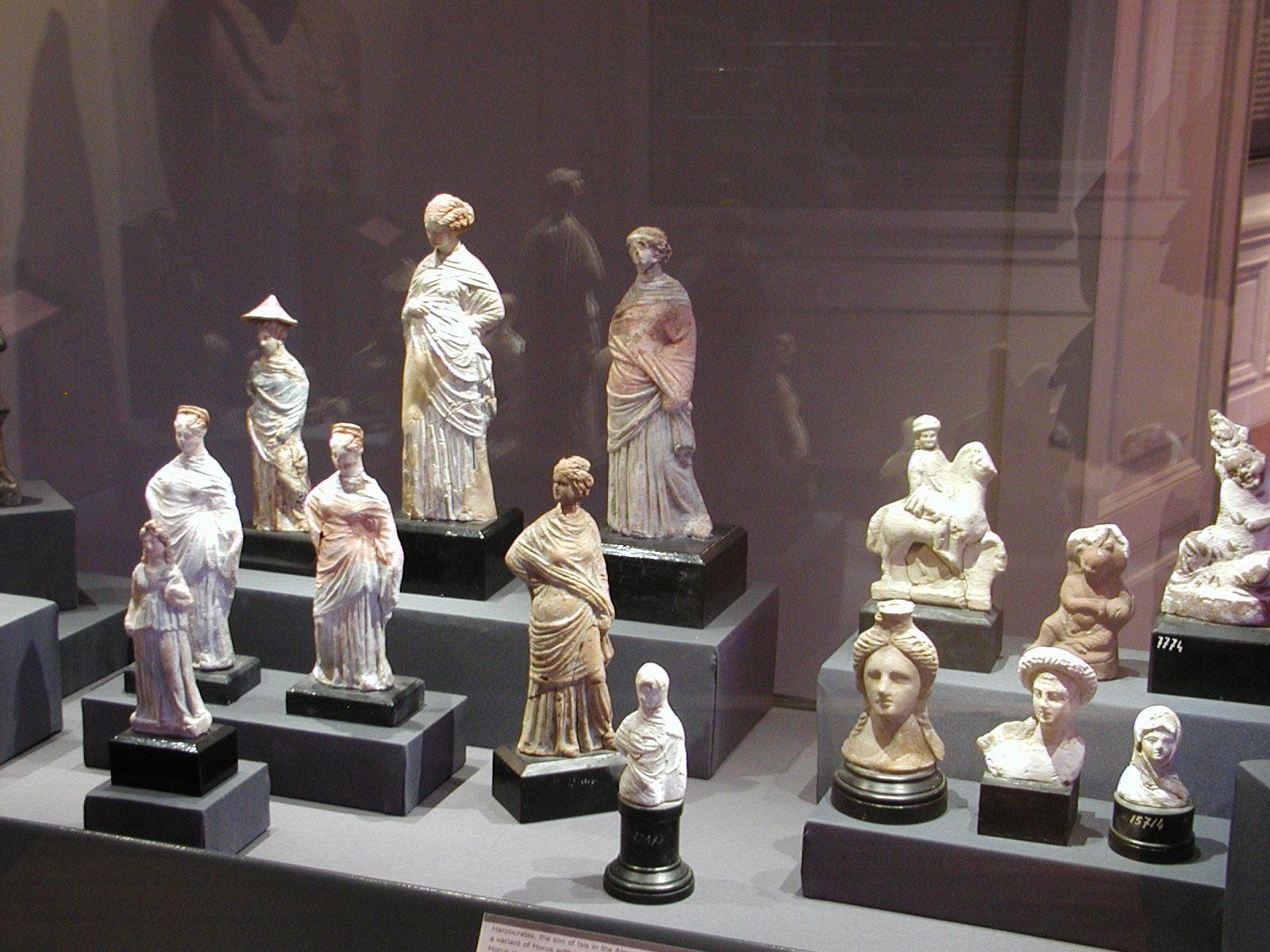
Collection of terracotta figures from Alexandria, Egypt.

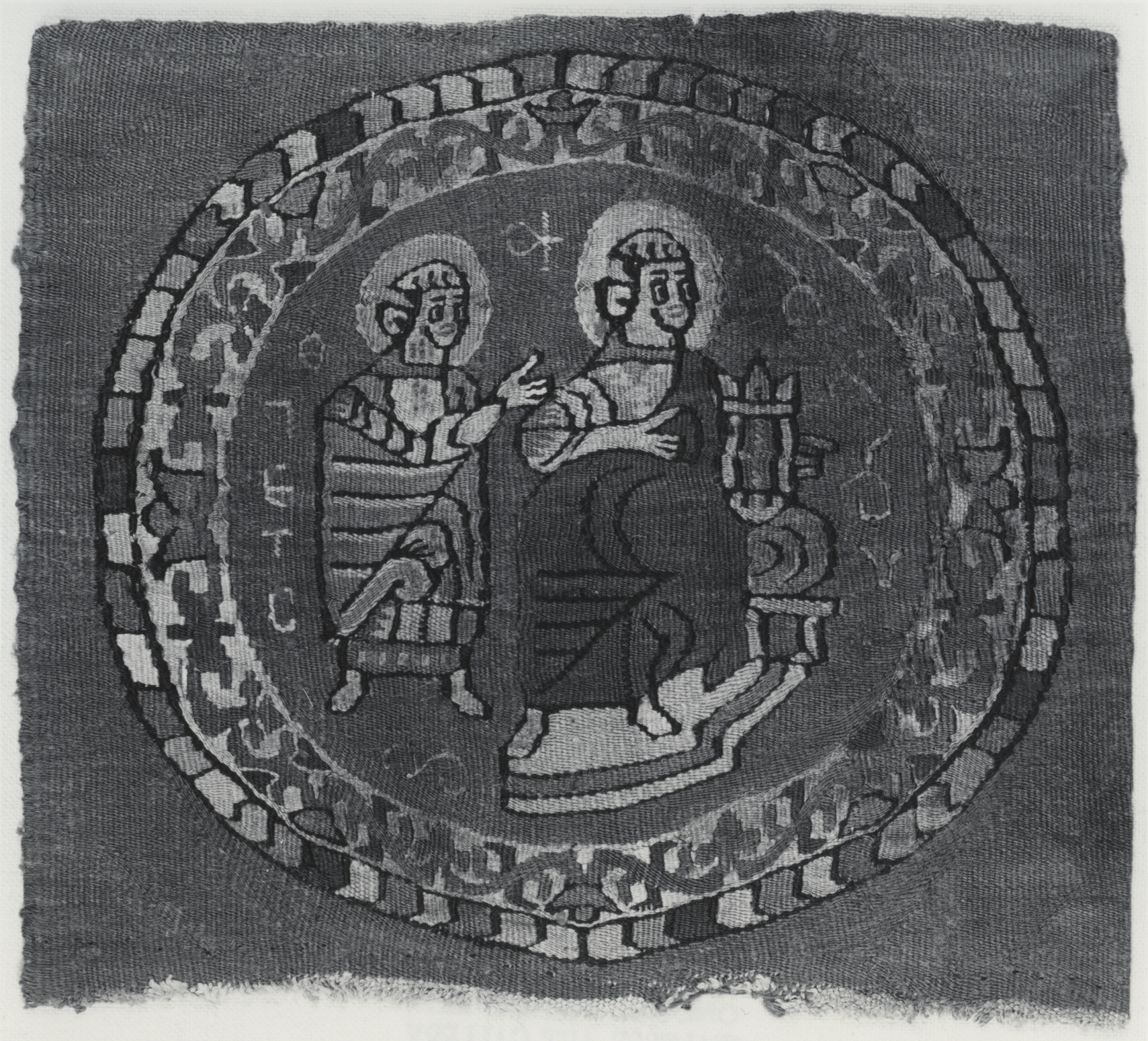
David and Saul wearing himations in a Coptic textile.

Depictions of Egyptian women wearing dark wraps similar to the melaya in English date back to Richard Pocoke's drawing of such a garment, in 1743.

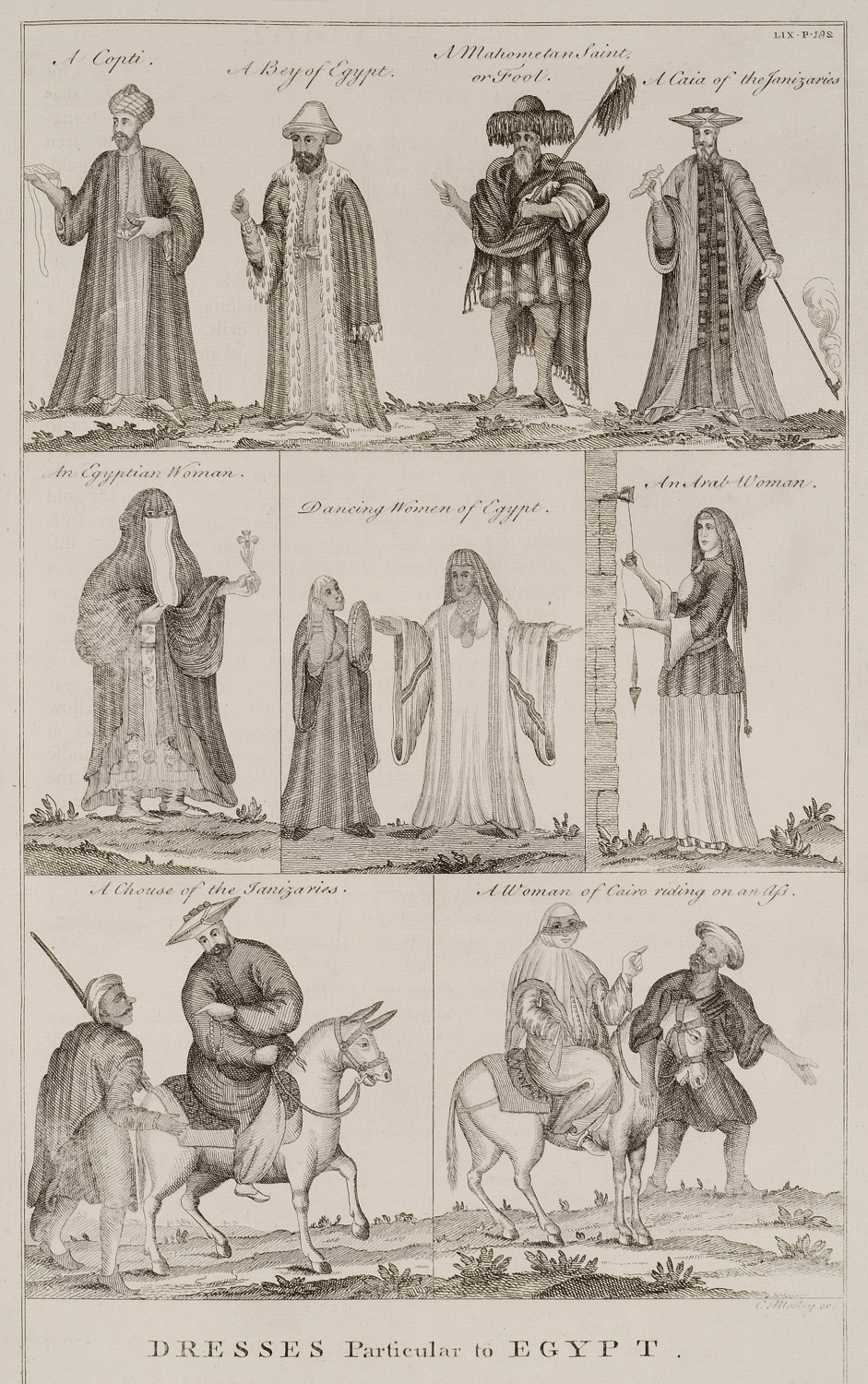
Garment is depicted in middle left drawing.

However, the first recorded use of the term "Melaya" (or, more accurately, "milayeh") in English sources comes from Edward William Lane's work. He recounts it as being made of blue and white checked cotton fabric, with red at the ends, and distinct from the silk habarah.

The habarah was black for married women, and white for unmarried. It was held in place by a piece of ribbon sewn near the upper edge and tied around the head. Both are 3 yards of ell-width fabric sewn together down the middle, creating an overall width of 2 and a half yards. He notes there being a silk milayeh, made in different colors, but states it isn't often worn and provides no further description.

In addition to this, Lane notes that during the bridal procession, brides wear a red Kashmir shawl, or a white or yellow shawl, though instead of resting on the head and falling on the back of the body, it conceals the front and back. This was worn overtop a cap or crown of thick paper, and a kussah (a type of forehead jewelry similar to the Algerian Khit errouh) was pinned to the outside of the shawl, with other ornaments being hidden under the shawl.

As already noted, not all mantles of this type in Egypt were called melaya. Regional variations had different names, and certain styles recognizable as melaya, or similar to melaya, were not necessarily called as such. The convention is for the mantle in Coptic art to be called a palla, and the habarah has already been mentioned.

In Assiut, one finds the shugga, said to have originated in Mamluk Egypt. It fully covers the body and is made of six or seven meters of lightweight silk or a similar material. It is made by sewing two lengths of fabric selvage to selvage, and folding the ends to the center front, then stitching to create shoulder seams and a front opening. Another style of shugga also worn in Assiut is made of a floor length gathered skirt, with a long panel extending from the waist that drapes in two bunches over the hips and is thrown over the head. This two piece style was similar to a style of hubbara called the sharshaf, also worn in Sanaa.

In Luxor one finds the hubbara, made of medium weight black silk, lightweight rayon with a ribbed stripe and twisted fringe, or coarse wool. It measures 1 1/2 × 3 or 4 meters, and some have deep purple stripes. It is normally worn with one edge folded back over the head, making a double thickness, and a single thickness over the shoulders and back.

In Sohag, Idfu, and Kom Ombo, there is the birda, named for a striped wool fabric called bird, said to have been worn by the Prophet. It may be made of coarse wool, fine wool, or rayon. Sometimes it is made of brown wool with a red or green stripe by the finged ends, sometimes it is striped all over in brown and black, and foreign made fabric has the selvage left visible to show its place of manufacture, and looks like a stripe at a distance. It is worn in two ways: draped over the crown of the head or with one end attached to the waist and thrown over the head.

In Qena and Bahriya one finds the nishra or futa, a fine plaid wool rectangle with fringed ends and a black background and red and white lines. Between Qena and Luxor, as well as Sudan, there is also the ferka, which is a yellow, white, and black plaid rectangle of cloth. If a woman in Qena does not wear these wears the birda, but this birda will be of a fine black wool.

By the 20th century, the melaya came to refer to a black mantle, a reversal from the distinction Lane records. By 1987, a lower-class woman wearing a melaya would be assumed to be Muslim over being Christian.

Farida Fahmy and the Reda Troupe are often credited with the invention of dance that uses the melaya as a prop. While this is debated, it is true that she and the Reda Troupe invented a theatrical dance using it. The first dance, according to Mahmoud Reda, was a skit where a licorice seller angered a woman by spilling syrup on her, and she threw off her melaya to fight him. The melaya in this use was part of the archetypal "bint al balad" (lit. Daughter or girl of the country). This character type has been compared to the American "girl next door". In the early to mid 20th century, various actresses can be seen wearing the melaya in its black, plain version. The dancing versions worn today often feature paliettes and sequins, in silver, gold, and multicolor. According to Reda, while stretchy and chiffon fabric is common, the proper fabric for a dancer's melaya is made of tiny pleats so that it's stretchy, but still resembles a modesty garment.

The melaya is likely related to other Saharan draped mantles such as the Sudanese toub, north Nigerian laffaya, and the dampe, as seen by the similarity of the garments and the fact that they are in geographic proximity.

== Ways of wearing ==
A common way of wearing the melaya is to have it rest on the head, with the rest of it wrapped around the body or resting on the arms. Another way of wearing is wrapping it around the waist, and having it tucked to create a hood over the woman's head.

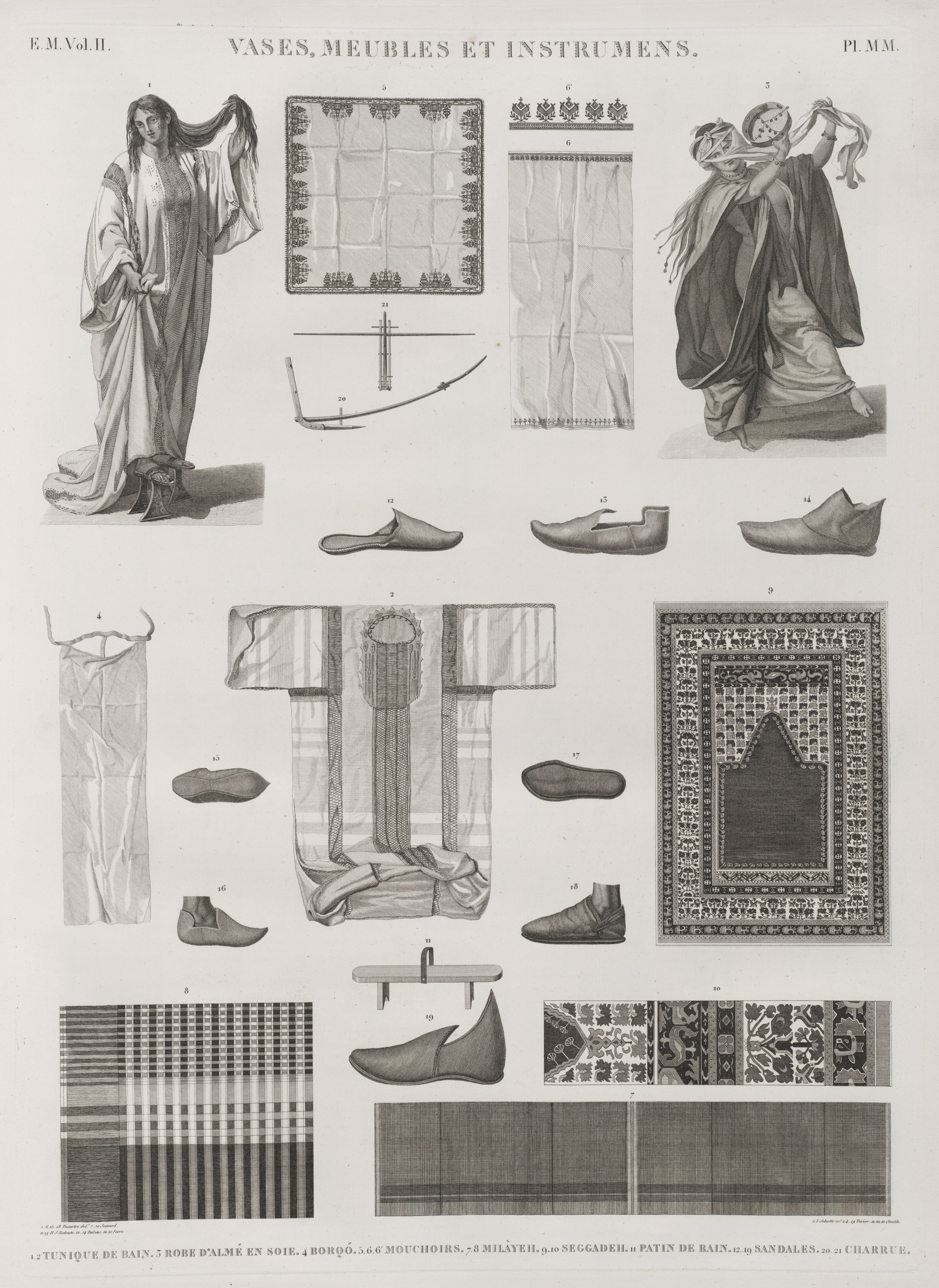
Lower left depicts pattern described by Lane

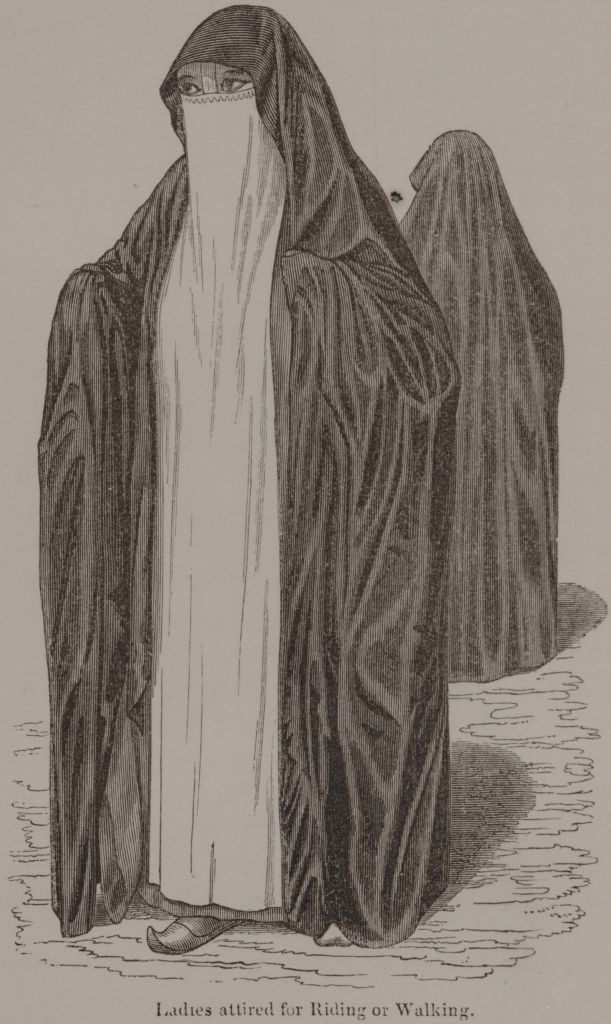
Ladies attired for Riding or Walking

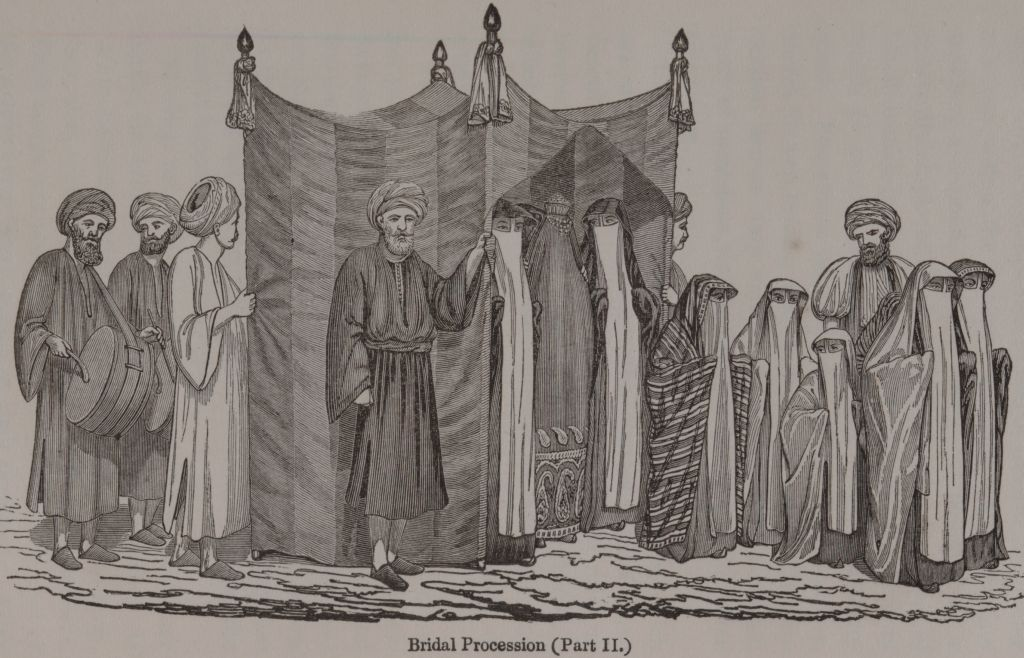
Depiction of the Bridal procession, with the bride wearing the red shawl

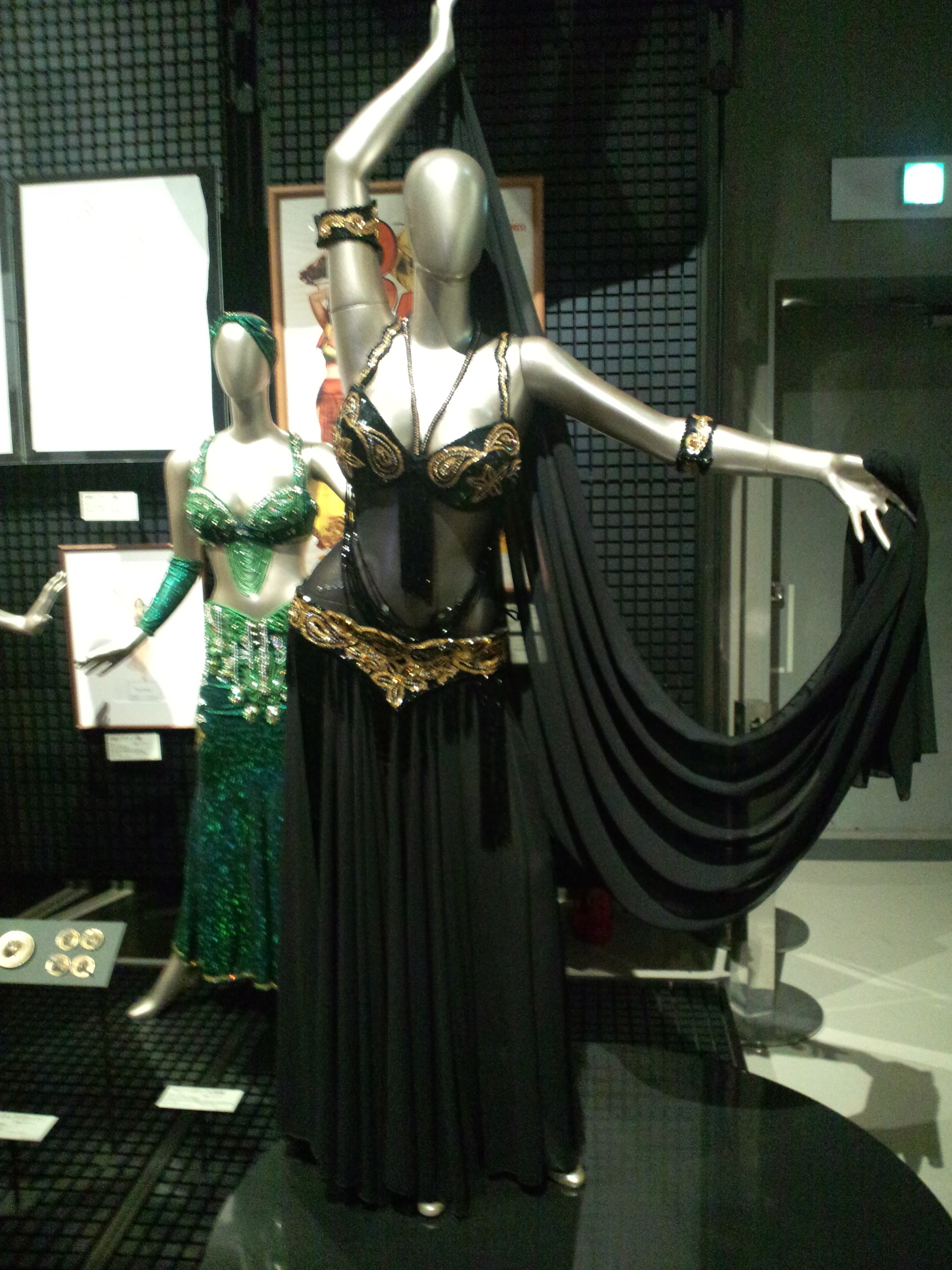
Belly dance costume worn by Dandash

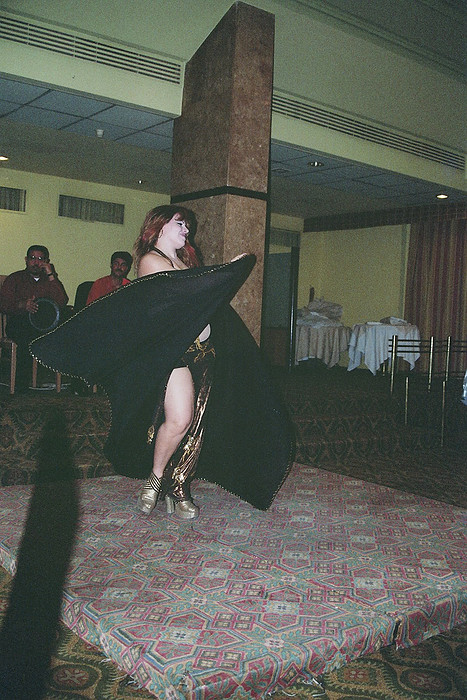
Raqs sharqi in Luxor

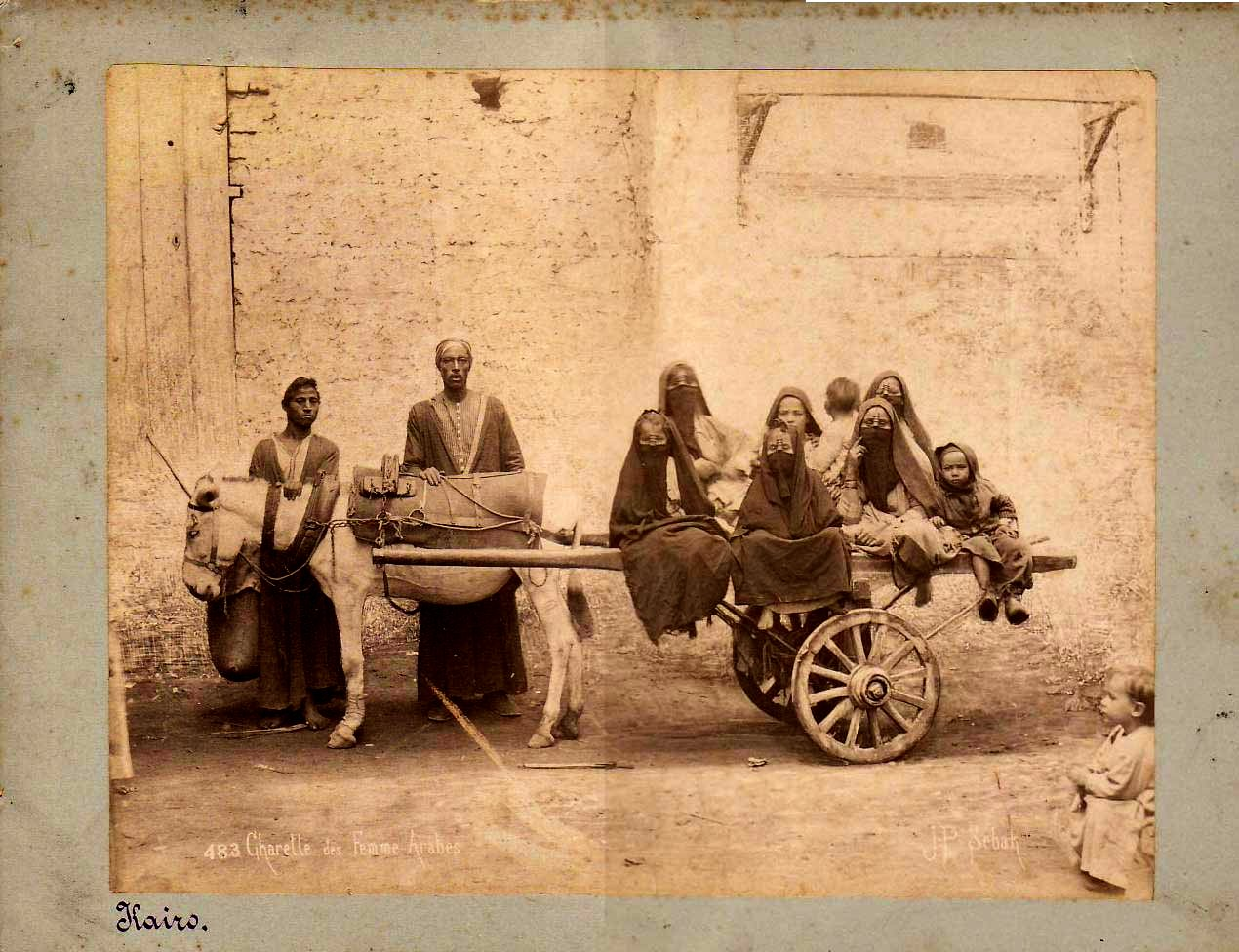
Jean Pascal Sebah n.483 "Charette_des_femmes_arabes"

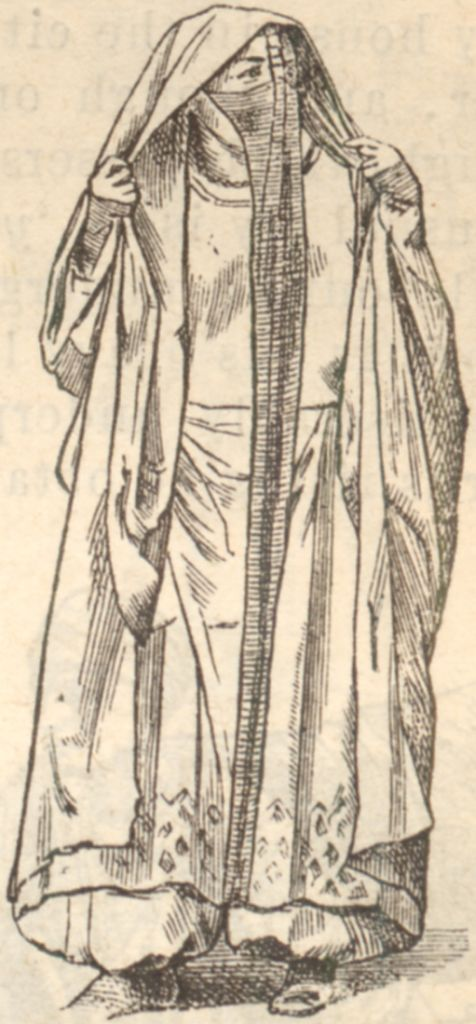
Lady In Walking Dress, 1885

== See also ==
- M'laya
- Galabiya
- Egyptian Cultural Dress
