= Clothing in Sudan =

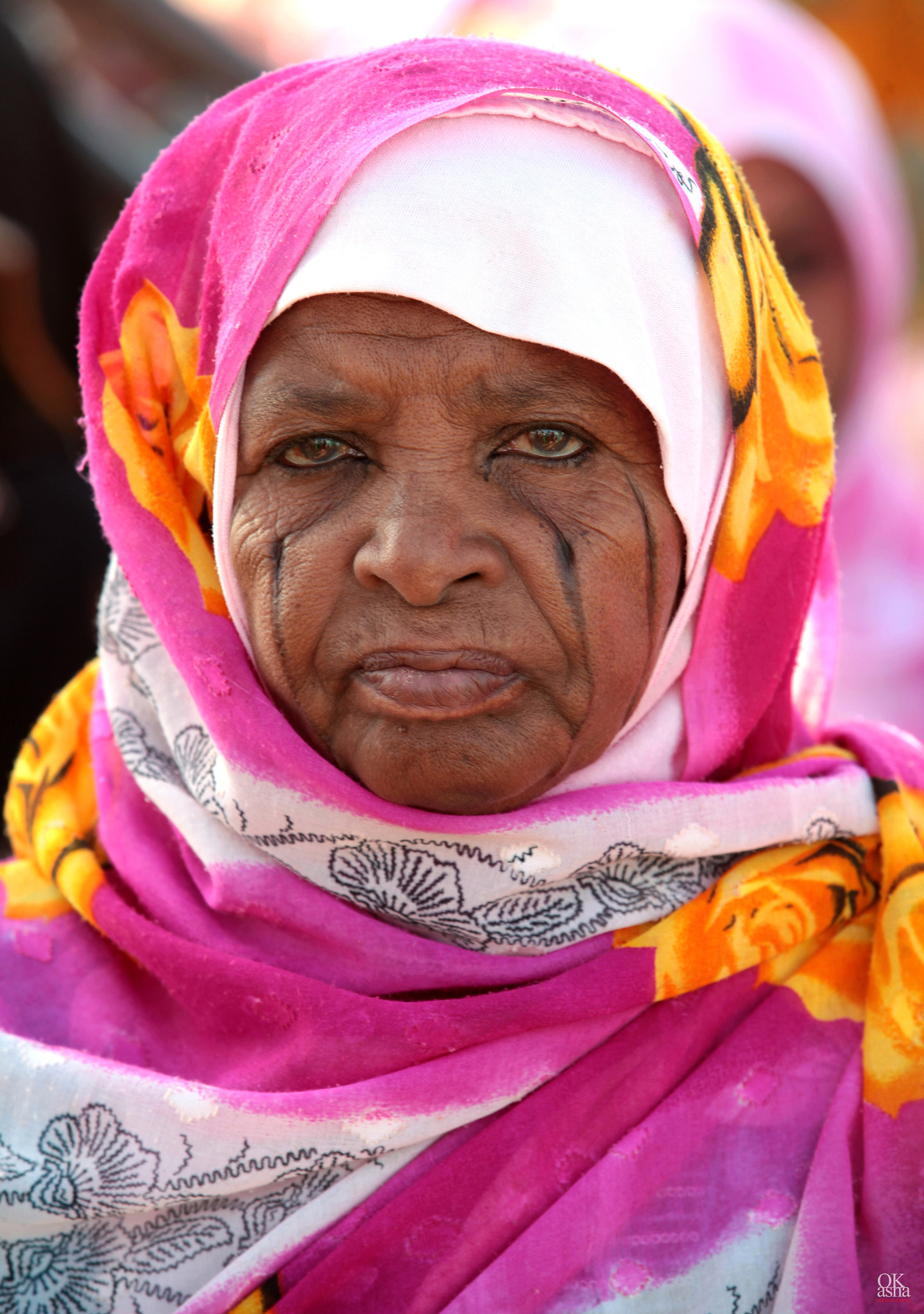
Woman, with scarifications, wearing a Thawb

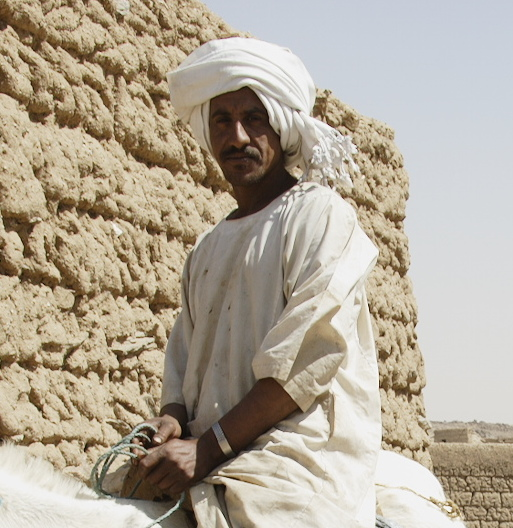
Manasir man wearing a turban

Sudan is home to nearly 600 ethnic groups and clothing reflects the country's ethnic, regional, and historical diversity, shaped by centuries of cultural exchange along Nile Valley and across Sahel and Red Sea regions. Most Sudanese wear a combination of traditional and modern attire, with choices often influenced by climate, social setting, and religious norms.

For men, the jalabiya, a loose-fitting, ankle-length robe remains the most recognizable garment, often paired with a turban and shawl, with variations in fabric and style reflecting regional and seasonal preferences

Women’s clothing is equally distinctive, with toub (also spelled thobe or tobe), a long, rectangular cloth draped around the body and head, serving as both a marker of identity and a form of artistic expression. Across Sudan, clothing is a matter of personal choice but also a visible symbol of heritage, social status, and community belonging.

== Traditional Clothing ==
=== Women ===
In Sudan, toub is the most common women clothing, a long, rectangular piece of fabric usually 2 meters wide and between 4 and 7 meters long, wrapped around the body and head. It is typically worn over a dress, and may be made of cotton, silk, or synthetic blends. Historically worn in solid white or muted earth tones, modern styles feature intricate embroidery, vibrant colors and imported fabrics. It plays a key role in weddings, mourning, political gatherings, and everyday life, often indicating a woman’s marital status or social role. However, styles, fabrics, and meanings of women’s attire vary significantly across Sudan’s regions, shaped by geography, history, and community traditions.

Origins and Historical Roots of the 'Toub'

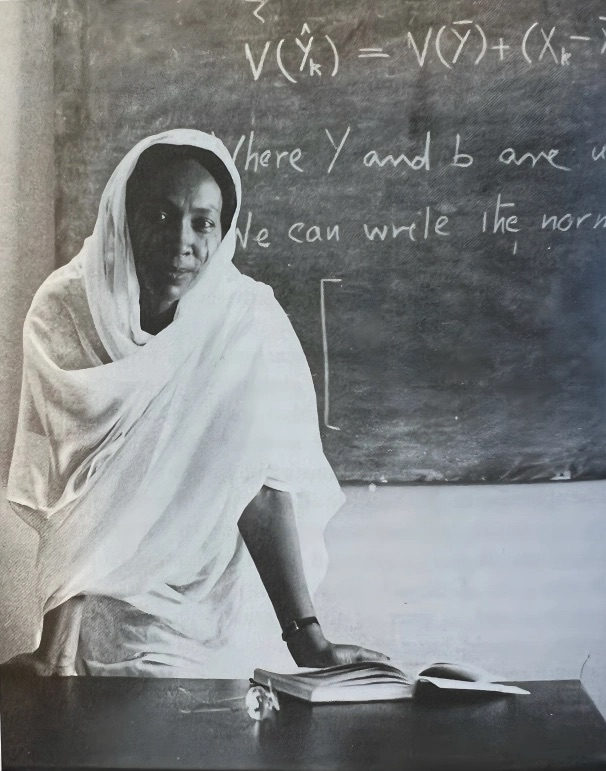
Lecturer Bakhita Amin Ismail, University of Khartoum, 1980.

The toub’s origins trace back to Ancient Sudan, with archaeological evidence and historical accounts linking similar garments to ancient Nubian and Kerma civilizations. Murals and artifacts from the Kingdom of Kush and Meroë depict women in body-length, draped garments, suggesting a longstanding tradition of wrapped attire in the Nile Valley.

In contemporary Sudan, the plain white toub is often worn by teachers, nurses, and professional women, especially in urban centers. It has come to symbolize education, civic responsibility, modest professionalism and resilience.

Through trans-Saharan trade routes and Islamic cultural exchange, variations of the toub spread from Sudan into Sahel and West Africa around the eleventh century. This was facilitated by centuries of textile trade, movement of peoples, and adoption of Islamic dress codes across the Sahara, resulting in similar wrapped garments becoming markers of identity and modesty in Chad to Mauritania, Mali and northern Nigeria.

==== Northern and Central Sudan ====
In Northern Sudan among Nubian communities, women’s clothing retains visible links to ancient traditions. The toub here is often brightly colored and intricately patterned, echoing the vibrant designs seen in ancient Nubian art. The use of indigo-dyed cloth, known as zarag toub, is particularly notable, symbolizing status.

In Central Sudan regions like Sennar and White Nile, women also commonly wear the toub, often in lighter fabrics suited to the warmer climate. It is typically adorned with subtle embroidery and worn with modest jewelry, reflecting both cultural identity and social norms.

===== Eastern Sudan and Red Sea Communities =====
Among Beja peoples of eastern Sudan including Hadendowa, Beni Amer, and Bisharin, women’s clothing has long served as a marker of ethnic identity. Ethnographic studies note that Beja women traditionally wear brightly colored cloths wrapped around their dresses, often accompanied by beaded jewelry and in some cases, large nose rings. The Hadendowa are described as fond of colorful garments and elaborate personal adornment, reflecting both their social status and cultural heritage.

The Beni Amer are recognized for distinctive dress and accessories and historical accounts document that clothing and textiles are important elements in marriage and social exchanges within the community.

Bisharin, another Beja subgroup, adept their clothing to desert conditions by favoring lighter fabrics and jewelry, consistent with broader Beja material culture and adaptation to the harsh environment.

The Rashaida, an Arab group that settled in Sudan in the 19th century, are widely recognized for their distinctive black embroidered cloaks thawb and facial veils, which are described in ethnographic and historical studies as key markers of their group identity and distinction from neighboring populations.

===== Western Sudan =====
In western Sudan, particularly in Darfur and Kordofan, women wear the toub along with other colorful, layered garments. Fabric choices are adapted to the arid climate and social setting, ranging from lightweight cotton for everyday wear to more ornate fabrics for special occasions. According to local reporting, Fur, Masalit, Hausa, Nuba, and Fulani communities wear bold colors, layered wraps, embroidery, and henna-stamped patterns to express identity and style. Clothing remains a powerful symbol of pride, resilience, and femininity in these communities.

Southern Sudan

Traditional clothing in Blue Nile and South Kordofan varies significantly. Among the Nuba Mountains, women wear brightly colored wraps or skirts, which may be made from locally sourced cloth or animal skins, and are often adorned with beads, shells, and sometimes cowrie decorations. The styles and materials vary between the Nuba's fifty different ethnic groups, but handmade beadwork and natural hairstyles or braids are common features. Clothing plays a central role in cultural festivals such as the Kambala, where dress, jewelry, and body adornment symbolize pride and resilience. Museum collections confirm these garments are used for both daily life and special occasions.

== Men ==
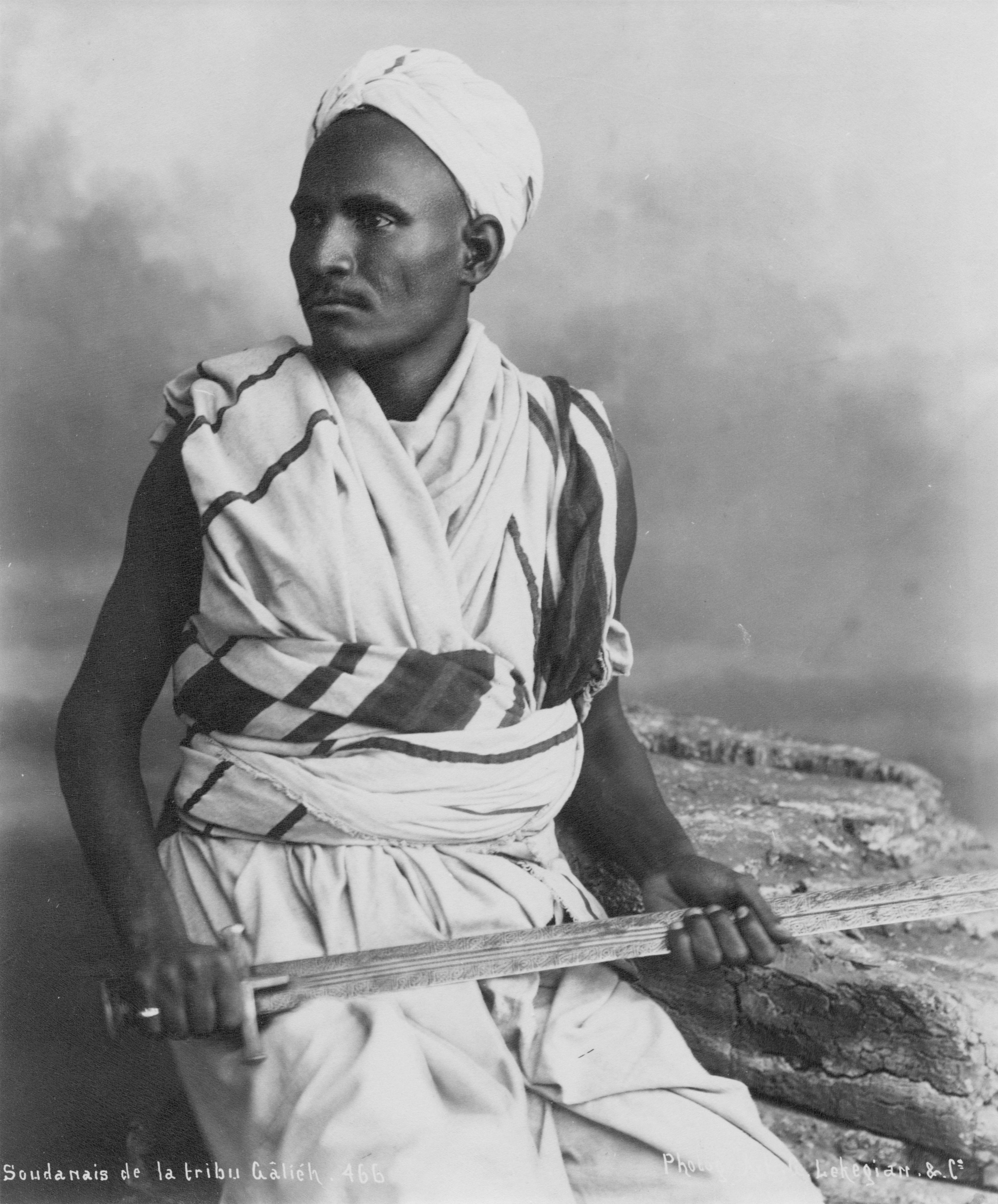
Warrior from the tribe of the Ja'alin wearing a traditional cloths and holding a kaskara

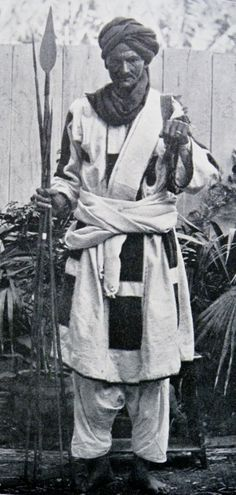
A Mahdist soldier wearing a jibba (1899)

The national traditional attire for men is the Jalabiya, a long white garment and can vary based on the region and ethnic background. The Jalabiya has remained a popular fashion choice for Sudanese men across different tribes.

Different regions within Sudan showcase unique fashion influences. In the Nubian region, clothing reflects the remnants of the great Kush civilization with its bright colors and playful designs. Eastern Sudanese men wear a longer Jalabiya accompanied by loose pants and vests, while western Sudan exhibits a mix of tribal and foreign influences, resulting in modern designs and African fabric patterns.

Wearing Jibba, Taqiyah (cap), and Markoob is common.

The markoub is one of the most important features that make up the Sudanese identity, in addition to the white turban, jalabiya, waistcoat, top and pants, and with their integration they represent the Sudanese national dress. In the past, there was a boat for women, but it has now disappeared. The boat is made by hand in Sudan and varies in its shapes and sizes, including the boat of El Fasher and made in the city of El Fasher in western Sudan, the boat of Jenny and the boat of Al Jazeera Aba. The price, the skin of cows, sheep, and even crocodiles, and the Sudanese love to wear it during the two Eid prayers, and it is one of the symbols of Sudanese culture and the admiration of many Sudanese tourists.

== Children ==
Kids' clothing in Sudan is heavily influenced by a combination of cultural, religious, and regional factors. Traditional attire for Sudanese children is deeply rooted in the country's Islamic heritage, with a strong emphasis on modesty, particularly in accordance with Islamic principles.

Islamic values play a significant role in shaping children's clothing choices. Both boys and girls are encouraged to wear garments that cover their arms and legs, reflecting the importance of modesty in Islamic culture. For girls, this often entails wearing headscarves, especially as they reach adolescence. Traditional Sudanese clothing, such as the "Jalabiya," is also a common choice for children. The Jalabiya is a loose-fitting, long-sleeved, ankle-length garment, known for its comfort and suitability in Sudan's warm climate.

Bright and vibrant colours are prevalent in Sudanese children's attire, and natural fabrics like cotton are favoured for their breathability and comfort, which is essential given Sudan's hot weather conditions. Accessories such as bracelets, necklaces, and rings are worn by Sudanese children, although these adornments are typically modest and simple in design. During special occasions and celebrations like Eid, Sudanese children adorn themselves in their finest clothing, often featuring more elaborate and colourful outfits, aligning with the festive spirit of these events.

Footwear choices for children vary depending on whether they live in urban or rural areas. Urban children are more likely to wear modern shoes like sneakers, while those in rural areas may opt for traditional sandals or even go barefoot, reflecting the influence of regional factors on attire choices.

== Accessories ==
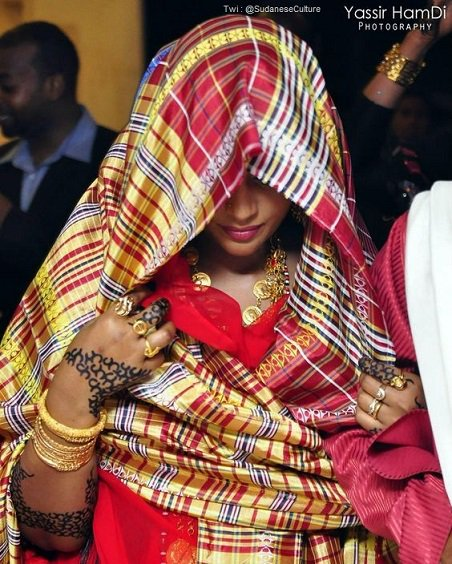
Sudanese bride in traditional costume (qarmis)

Sudanese jewellery has its origins trace back to ancient times, with archaeological excavations unearthing exquisite pieces made from materials such as gold, silver, and semi-precious stones. These artefacts provide a glimpse into the craftsmanship of ancient Sudanese civilizations. One notable influence on Sudanese jewellery is the Nubian civilization, renowned for its intricate gold ornaments. Many of these treasures have been discovered in tombs, underlining their importance in Nubian burial traditions.

Sudanese jewellery holds profound cultural significance and is often used to mark significant life events like weddings and ceremonies. The design and materials used can vary widely based on the ethnic group and regional customs within Sudan. Craftsmen employ a variety of materials, including gold, silver, beads, as well as natural elements like shells and bones. Traditional techniques like filigree, cloisonné, and beading have been passed down through generations.

In modern Sudan, jewellery making remains a thriving art form. Contemporary Sudanese artists and designers blend traditional techniques with new styles and ideas, keeping Sudanese jewellery vibrant and relevant. Economic factors have also played a role in jewellery production, with artisans often relying on this craft for both their livelihood and the preservation of cultural heritage during challenging times.

== Contemporary Clothing ==
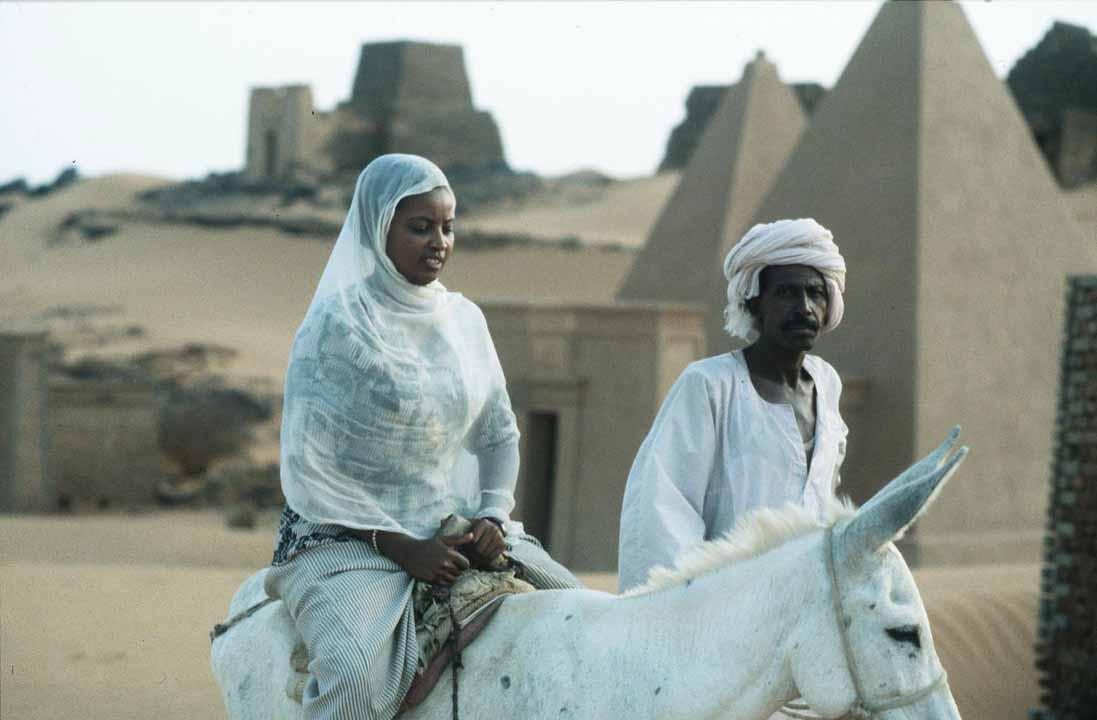
Sudanese woman wearing contemporary clothes, and Sudanese man wearing a jalabiya

In recent times, Sudan has experienced various influences on its fashion sense, including Islamic colonization and the introduction of modest fashion, hijabs, abayas, and niqāb. These influences have shaped the modern Sudanese fashion landscape, merging traditional elements with contemporary styles.

Due to a 1991 penal code (Public Order Law), women were not allowed to wear trousers in public, because it was interpreted as an "obscene outfit". The punishment for wearing trousers could be up to 40 lashes, but after being found guilty in 2009, one woman was fined the equivalent of 200 U.S. dollars instead. In some parts of Sudan, there may be restrictions on attire for women, such as wearing pants or trousers, and non-compliance with these norms can lead to legal consequences.

== Textile Industry ==
Sudan's fashion industry is evolving, and there is a growing interest in supporting local designers. Sudanese designers are emerging with brands like Amna's Wardrobe, offering elegant and modest clothing for special occasions.

Sudan's fashion history is intertwined with its textile industry. The country has a long-standing relationship with textiles, and the establishment of modern textile factories using locally produced cotton dates back to 1945.

== Significance of Clothing ==
Traditional clothing remains a powerful expression of cultural identity across Sudan’s many regions and ethnic groups. For many Sudanese, wearing garments such as the toub, jalabiya, or region-specific wraps is not only a matter of personal style, but a visible link to ancestral heritage, social values, and community belonging. Clothing often marks key life stages such as marriage, mourning, or initiation and reflects regional, religious, and generational identities. In both rural and urban areas, traditional dress continues to coexist with contemporary fashion, symbolizing pride, resilience, and cultural continuity in the face of social and political change.
