= Melhfa =

Traditional Saharan cloth

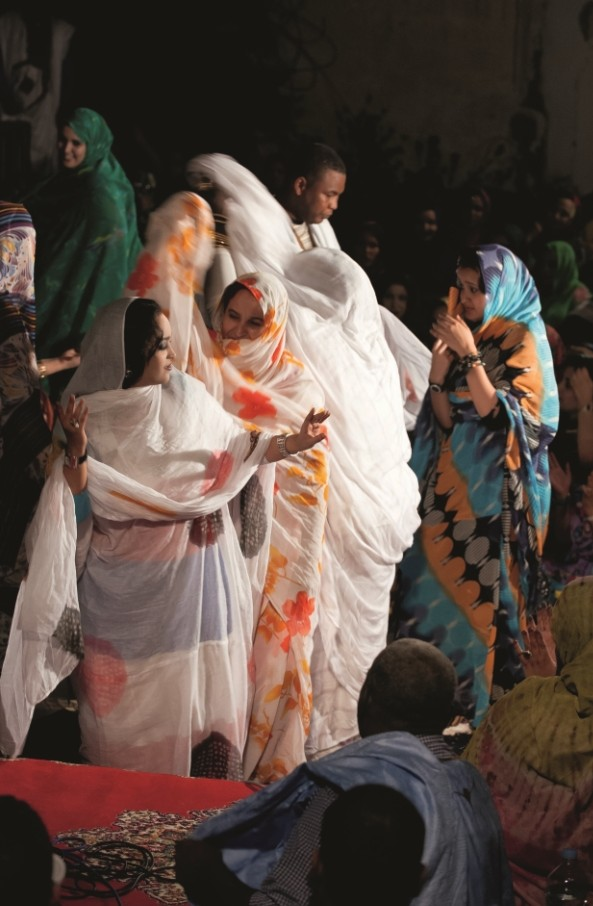
Sahrawi women wearing colorful melhfas

Melhfa, also known as Toungou, Tassaghnist, Laffaya, or Dampé, is a traditional cloth commonly found across the Sahel and Sahara regions of Africa. The melhfa is a long rectangular cloth, typically measuring 4.5 meters by 1.6 meters, skillfully wrapped around the wearer's head and body.

It traditionally served as a means of protection from the harsh weather of the region and is typically made from natural fabrics such as cotton.

== Etymology ==
The Melhfa has different names in the various languages of the region. Across the Maghreb, it is known as melhfa (sometimes spelled Melfha, melafa, meulfeu, or mlahef). In Mauritania and Mali, it is referred to as dampé, while in Northern Nigeria (Arewa), Niger, and Chad, it is known as lafaya or laffaya. The Songhai people call it toungou, and among the Tuareg, it goes by the name tassaghnist.

== Use ==
The melhfa is a traditional garment worn by women in the Sahel and Sahara regions of Africa. This flowing veil measures around 4 meters in length and 1 meter in width. Melhfas come in various styles – some reserved for festivals and ceremonies, while others are worn for daily activities. The melhfa wraps gracefully from head to toe, offering comfort in the desert's harsh conditions, with designs specifically crafted to endure the hot, dry climate and shield against cold, sand, and sun. It is an airy and roomy garment.

Among Songhai women, the melhfa, known as toungou in the Songhai language, is worn with traditional headwear such as the goffa, sorgou-sorgou, hilo-hilo, and Zumbu.

In Ougala, Algeria, the melhfa is commonly worn like a peplos over a shirt and is belted. It is also sometimes called a timelheft. It is understood as being the same garment as a haik, just usually in a different color and material.

For Sahrawi women, the melhfa is both an important symbol of identity and controversial as a garment that may enforce sexist ideas about women, modesty, respectability, and sexuality. Women who don't wear a melhfa may not be taken seriously when speaking among the community. However, these feelings may be partly context dependent and differ depending on if one lives in a Muslim majority society or not.

In Sudan, the toub is commonly believed to have been worn for thousands of years and connected to historical figures like Queen Kandaka. Different colors are associated with different life stages and stages of the wedding, as well as the aesthetic preferences of different ethnic groups.

In recent years, the Melhfa has become increasingly adorned with intricate embroidery, prominently displayed along its edges or as a pattern on the front or back of the garment. This embellishment, often executed in vibrant colors and geometric shapes, serves as a testament to the artisanal skill involved. The Melhfa has gained considerable popularity in contemporary times, making appearances in fashion shows and being donned by celebrities. This visibility has contributed to heightened awareness of the cultural and craftsmanship elements associated with this garment.

Modern influences have been incorporated into the melhfa, reflecting the changing tastes and preferences of younger generations.

The melhfa is similar to the variety of wraps worn Egypt, commonly called melaya leff (wrapping sheet) in addition to regional names.
