= M'laya =

Algerian clothing

- Type: Veil
- Place of origin: Algeria

The M'laya (Arabic: ملاية) is a black veil that covers the whole body, it originated in Algeria.

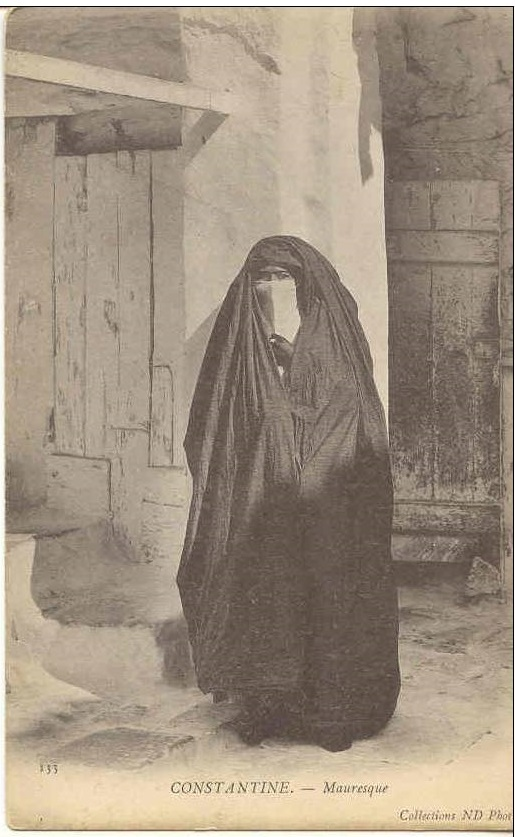
A woman in Constantine wearing the M'laya

The origin of the M'laya goes back to the 18th century and is connected to the death of Salah Bey who was the Bey of Constantine. Following his tragic death a tradition emerged in Constantine of wearing the M'laya. The M'laya is black in colour unlike the haik which is white. The M'laya covers the entire body and is said to have been a symbol of modesty.

== See also ==
- Haik
- Melaya leff
- Ghlila
- Algerian Kaftan
- Djebba Fergani
