= Markoob =

Sudanese shoes

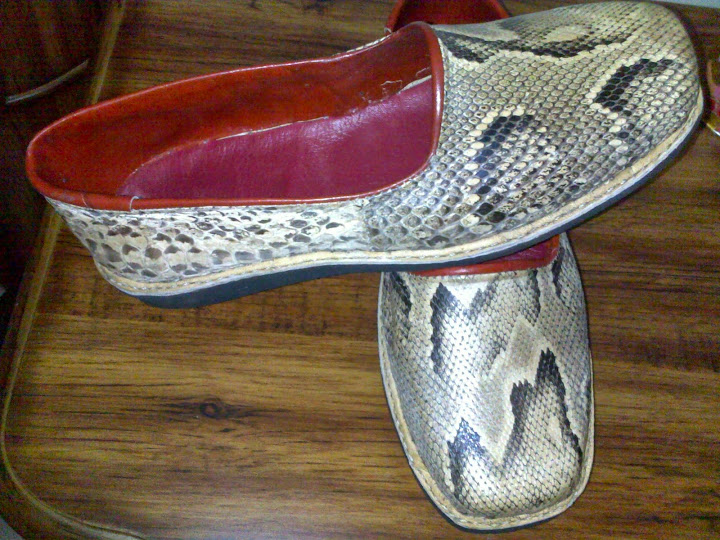
Markoob

Markoob or markoub (Arabic: مركوب; plural Marakib) is a type of footwear designed for Sudanese men crafted from animal skins. Alongside the white turban, jalabiya, waistcoat, top, and trousers, the Markoob forms part of the Sudanese national attire. In the past, there existed a female counterpart although it has now become a rarity. It has a historical evolution starting with the "Claudo" shoe, followed by "Abu Adina," leading to the enduring traditional Sudanese shoe.

The craftsmanship of the mirkoob is a distinctly Sudanese art form, with various styles and sizes available. Notable variations include the Al-Fashari mirkoob, crafted in the western Sudanese city of El Fasher, the Geneina mirkoob, and the Jazira Aba mirkoob, distinguished by its bright red color.

The materials used in making mirkoobs encompass a range of options, include the skin of pythonidae snakes, cowhide, sheepskin, and even crocodile skin, which is typically worn by the affluent.

The "cowhide" composite shoe stands out for its strength and aesthetics. Its production involves tanning the leather, lining it with goatskin for lightness, shaping the shoe's bottom, and sewing it with natural cotton threads. The final step involves sanding the sole for smoothness. Sudanese shoes made from genuine leather sourced from Nigeria and South Sudan are considered the highest quality and most expensive. They undergo similar production stages, including polishing with a stone and lemon treatment for shine.

Handcrafted Sudanese Markoob consists of a cowhide sole, tar-tanned, and an upper section, typically made from goat skin due to its strength and quality. The sewing process is manual and referred to as "brushing." One noteworthy tradition is the Sudanese preference for wearing mirkoobs during Eid prayers and special occasions.
