= Haik (garment) =

Traditional women's garment historically worn in Algeria

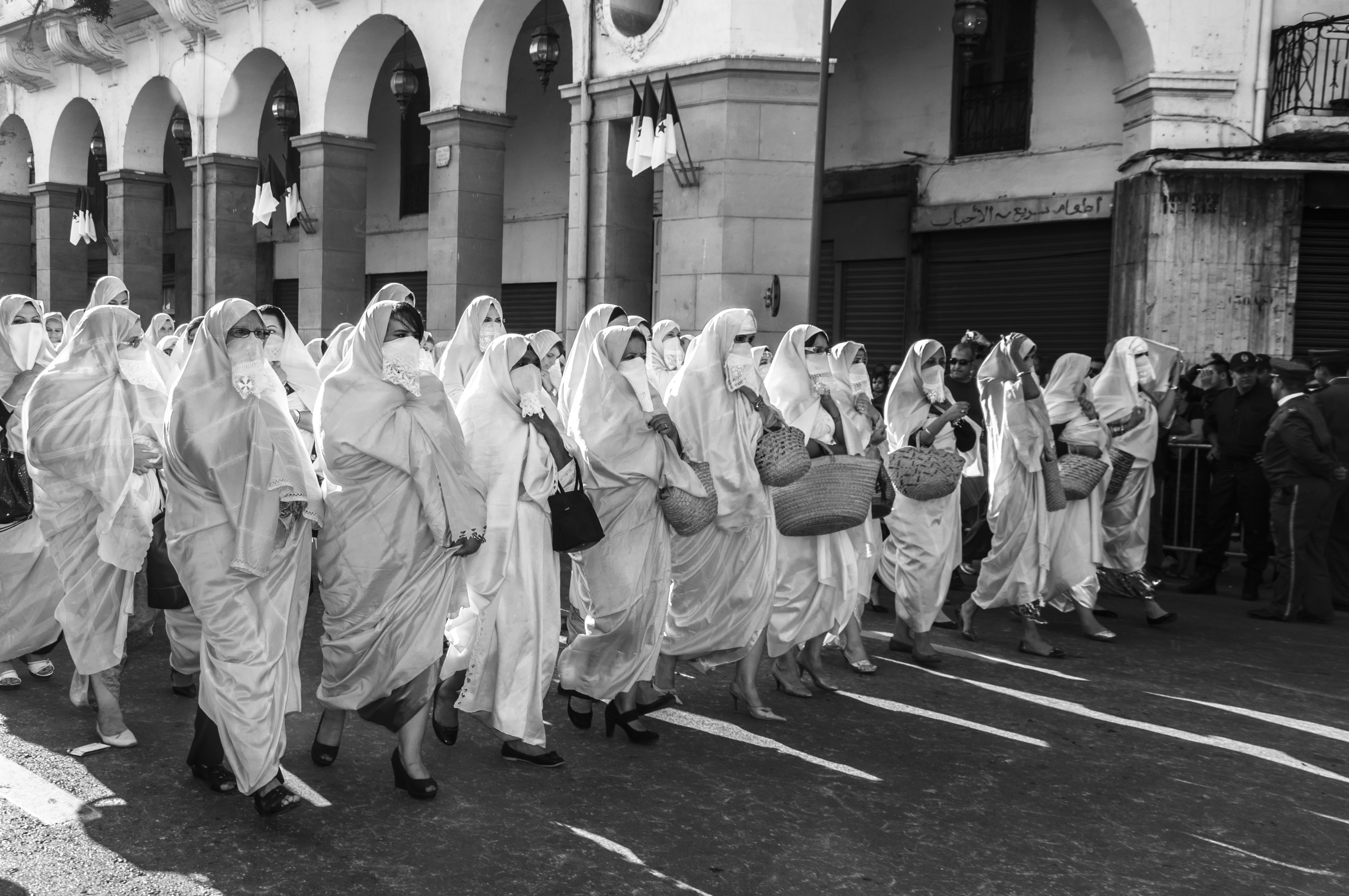
Algerian women wearing haiks during a demonstration in Algiers.

The haik (also haïk; Arabic: حايك) is a traditional women's outer garment with a long documented history in Algeria. It consists of a large rectangular piece of fabric wrapped around the body and head over the wearer's clothing. In Algeria it was historically worn in a number of cities and regions, with differences in fabric, quality, terminology and manner of wearing according to locality and social circumstances.

White became particularly associated with the haik in Algiers and other parts of northern and western Algeria. Historical examples were made from wool, cotton, silk or combinations of these materials.

The National Bardo Museum in Algiers has devoted an exhibition and a 169-page publication to the garment under the title El haïk : identité algérienne au féminin ("The Haik: Algerian Identity in the Feminine").

== Etymology ==
The word haik is derived from the Maghrebi Arabic word ḥāyik, related to the Arabic verb ḥāka, meaning "to weave".

The word entered French in a number of historical forms, including heque in 1654, hayque in 1667, alhaic and eque in 1670, haic in 1683 and hayc in 1686. The French word haïk was initially treated as feminine and later as masculine.

== History in Algeria ==
=== Sixteenth and seventeenth centuries ===
Woman of Algiers in an enveloping outer garment, from the work of Nicolas de Nicolay, sixteenth century.

The haik and closely corresponding terminology are documented in descriptions of Algiers from the late sixteenth century.

One important account appears in Topographia e Historia General de Argel, published in Valladolid in 1612 under the name of Diego de Haedo. Modern scholarship attributes the authorship of the work to the Portuguese cleric Antonio de Sosa, who had been held captive in Algiers.

The account describes women in Algiers covering themselves outside the home with a white facial covering and an outer woollen or wool-and-silk cloth called a huyque, which was wrapped around the body and drawn over the shoulders and head.

A modern study of Algerian clothing identifies Alhuyque among the historical forms of the name associated with descriptions of Algiers from this period.

European visual sources also document the clothing of women in Algiers. Nicolas de Nicolay produced sixteenth-century representations of women of Algiers wearing enveloping outer garments.

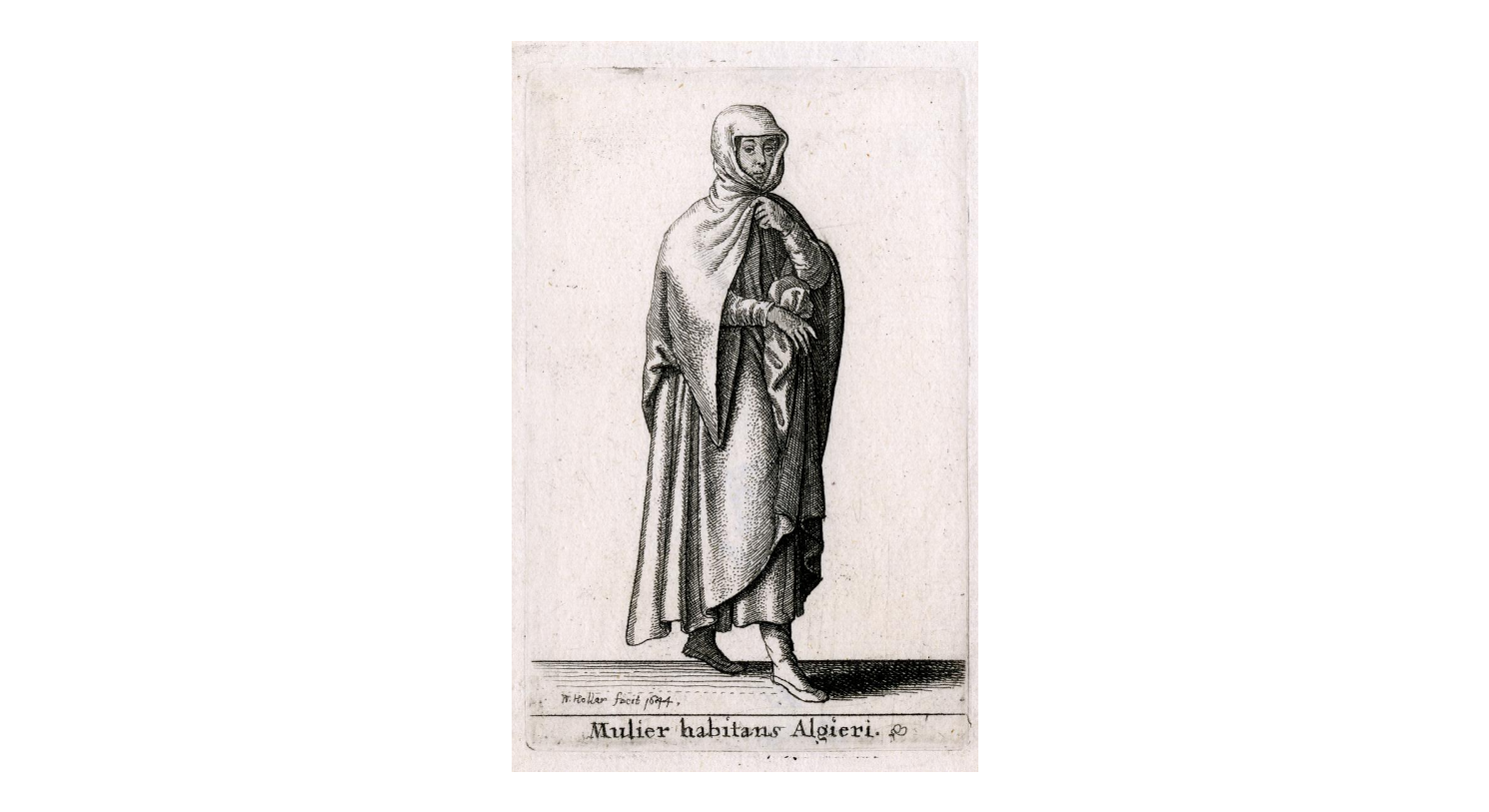
Woman of Algiers, engraving by Wenceslaus Hollar, 1644.

In 1644, Wenceslaus Hollar produced the engraving Mulier habitans Algieri, depicting a woman from Algiers in an enveloping outer garment. The work is held by the British Museum.

=== Nineteenth century ===
Algerian woman wearing a haik, Benjamin Roubaud, 1838.

During the nineteenth century, the haik was repeatedly documented by travellers, artists and writers describing Algeria.

American painter and writer Frederick Arthur Bridgman, who spent extended periods in Algeria, described the haik in his 1890 book Winters in Algeria. He noted that women's haiks were made from materials including handwoven wool, silk and white cotton, with the quality of the fabric varying according to the wearer's means.

Bridgman also described the outdoor dress of women in Algiers as predominantly white.

Travel literature and other historical sources documented the haik in several Algerian cities and regions, including Algiers, Constantine, Sétif, Bou Saâda, Oran and Tlemcen, while recording regional differences in fabric and manner of wearing.

=== Twentieth century ===
The haik continued to be a prominent element of women's outdoor dress in Algeria during the early twentieth century.

In Women of All Nations (1915), British anthropologist Thomas Athol Joyce described women in Algeria wearing a white haik over the head and body, accompanied in some cases by a smaller facial covering known as an adjar.

The garment also became involved in wider debates concerning women, colonialism, modernity and Algerian identity during the French colonial period.

Historian Sara Rahnama examines these debates in The Future Is Feminist: Women and Social Change in Interwar Algeria. One chapter, entitled "The Haik, the Hat, and the Gendered Politics of the New Public", examines the role of clothing in debates over tradition, modernity and the future of Algerian society during the interwar years.

The haik also acquired political symbolism during the Algerian War. Scholarship on colonial Algeria has examined the veil as part of the conflict over women's visibility, colonial assimilation policies and Algerian resistance.

The National Bardo Museum has likewise presented the haik as an element of Algerian national memory and has highlighted its role during the War of Independence.

== Description and wearing ==
The haik consists of a large, unsewn piece of cloth wrapped around the body and head. Historical examples were produced from wool, cotton, silk and mixed fabrics.

The garment was worn differently according to region. In Algiers, one method involved wrapping the material around the body and drawing the upper section over the head, while the edges were held beneath the chin.

Earlier forms could also be secured using fibulae or pins. By the late nineteenth century, methods of wearing the haik in Algiers had changed and simpler methods of holding the fabric around the body became common.

The style and quality of the haik could also communicate regional and social distinctions. Academic studies of Algerian clothing describe differences between the forms worn in central, western, eastern and southern parts of the country.

== Algerian varieties ==
Several forms of the haik developed in Algeria, differing according to material, quality and locality.

=== Haik m'rama ===
The haik m'rama or mrama was one of the finer forms of the garment and was particularly associated with women in Algiers.

Examples were woven from fine silk and could incorporate decorative threads. Because of the cost and quality of the material, the m'rama was historically associated particularly with wealthier urban women.

A less expensive form, known as the demi-m'rama, combined silk with other materials.

=== Haik sousti ===
The haik sousti was another form distinguished by its fabric and quality. Sources on Algerian traditional clothing describe it as a less expensive form than the m'rama.

=== Regional forms ===
Other regional forms and names were recorded in different parts of Algeria. Sources describe variations around Algiers and its suburbs as well as in Blida, Tlemcen, Oran, the east of Algeria and the regions of the south.

These differences concerned not only the textile but also the way in which the garment was wrapped, secured and combined with other pieces of clothing.

== Adjar ==
The adjar or aâjar (Arabic: عجار) is a smaller facial covering traditionally worn with some forms of the Algerian haik.

It covers the lower portion of the face while leaving the eyes visible. Historical descriptions of women's clothing in Algeria record the haik and adjar being worn together.

The appearance and method of fastening the adjar varied, and it could be made from fine or decorated fabric.

== Haik and m'laya ==
The haik and the m'laya are closely associated with the history of Algerian women's outdoor clothing but are distinguished particularly by colour and regional use.

The white haik was widely associated with Algiers and numerous western and central Algerian cities. The m'laya is a black enveloping garment historically associated particularly with Constantine and eastern Algeria.

A tradition links the adoption of the black m'laya in Constantine with mourning following the death of Salah Bey in 1792.

== Cultural significance ==
The haik became a recurring subject in engravings, paintings, travel literature, postcards and photography documenting Algerian society from the early modern period to the twentieth century.

It also acquired significance beyond its practical function as clothing. Studies of colonial Algeria have examined the haik in connection with changing ideas about women's public presence, colonial policy, cultural identity and resistance.

The National Bardo Museum in Algiers devoted an exhibition to the garment entitled El Haïk, identité algérienne au féminin, describing the haik in relation to Algerian women's identity and national memory. The museum subsequently published a 169-page volume with the same title.

== Present-day use ==
Everyday use of the haik declined considerably during the second half of the twentieth century as clothing practices in Algeria changed.

It nevertheless continues to appear in cultural events, commemorations, museum exhibitions and initiatives devoted to Algerian traditional dress.

== Use of the term outside Algeria ==
The term haik has also historically been used in European and North African sources for enveloping cloth garments in other parts of North Africa.

The forms, materials and ways of wearing garments described by this term differed between regions. These regional usages should therefore not be assumed to represent a single identical costume tradition.

A related term, huik, was also historically used for a different enveloping women's garment in the Netherlands and Belgium.

== Gallery ==
Woman of Algiers in an enveloping garment depicted by Nicolas de Nicolay, sixteenth century

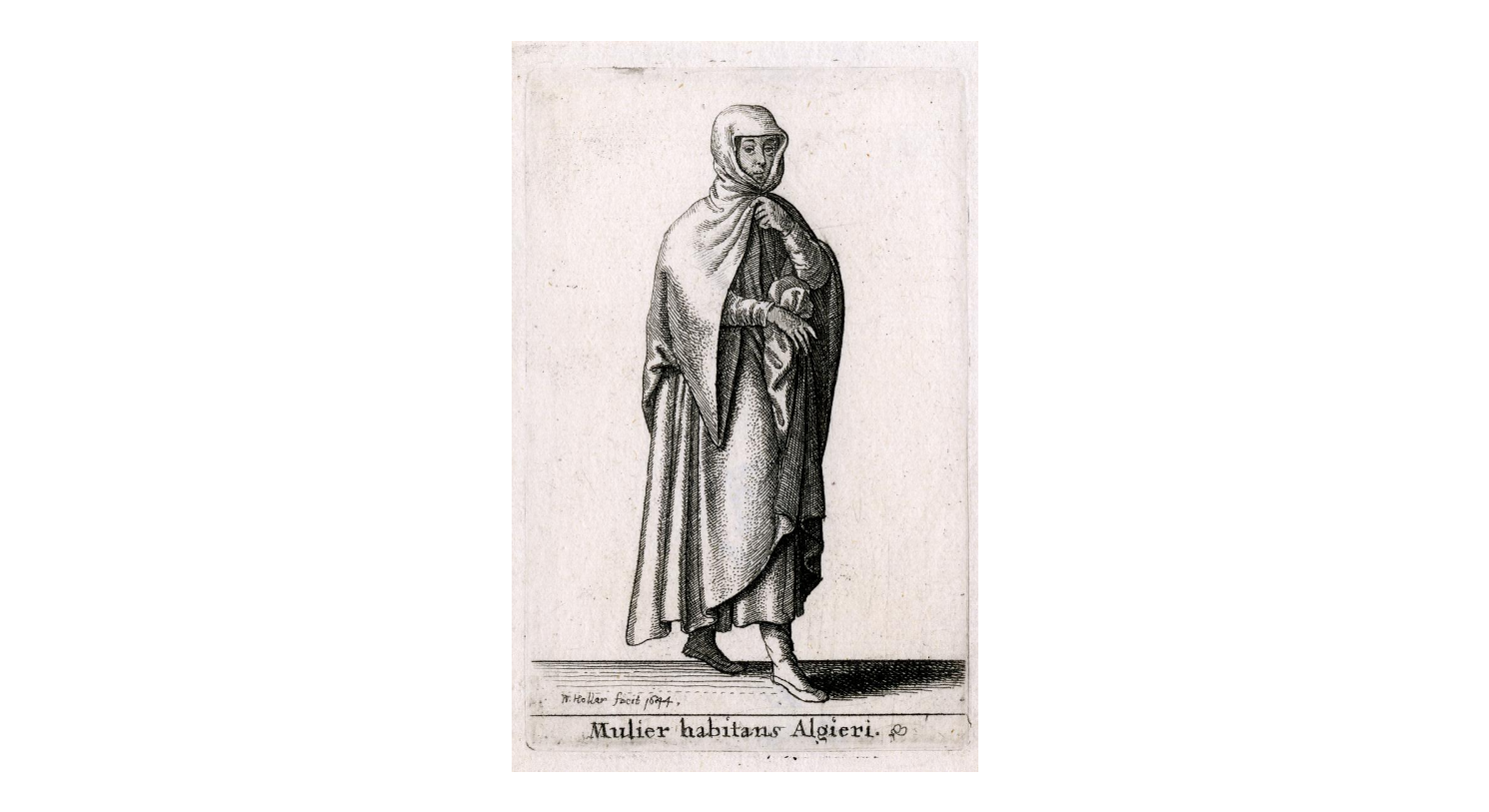
Woman of Algiers, engraving by Wenceslaus Hollar, 1644

Woman of Algiers wearing a haik, Benjamin Roubaud, 1838

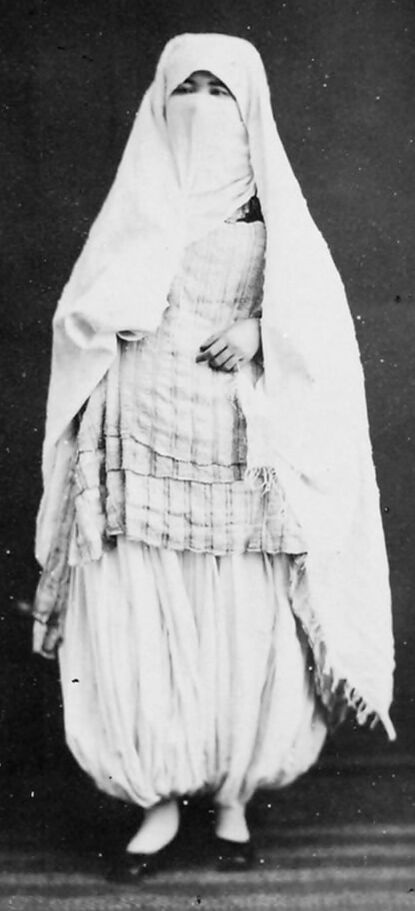
Woman of Algiers in a haik, 1884

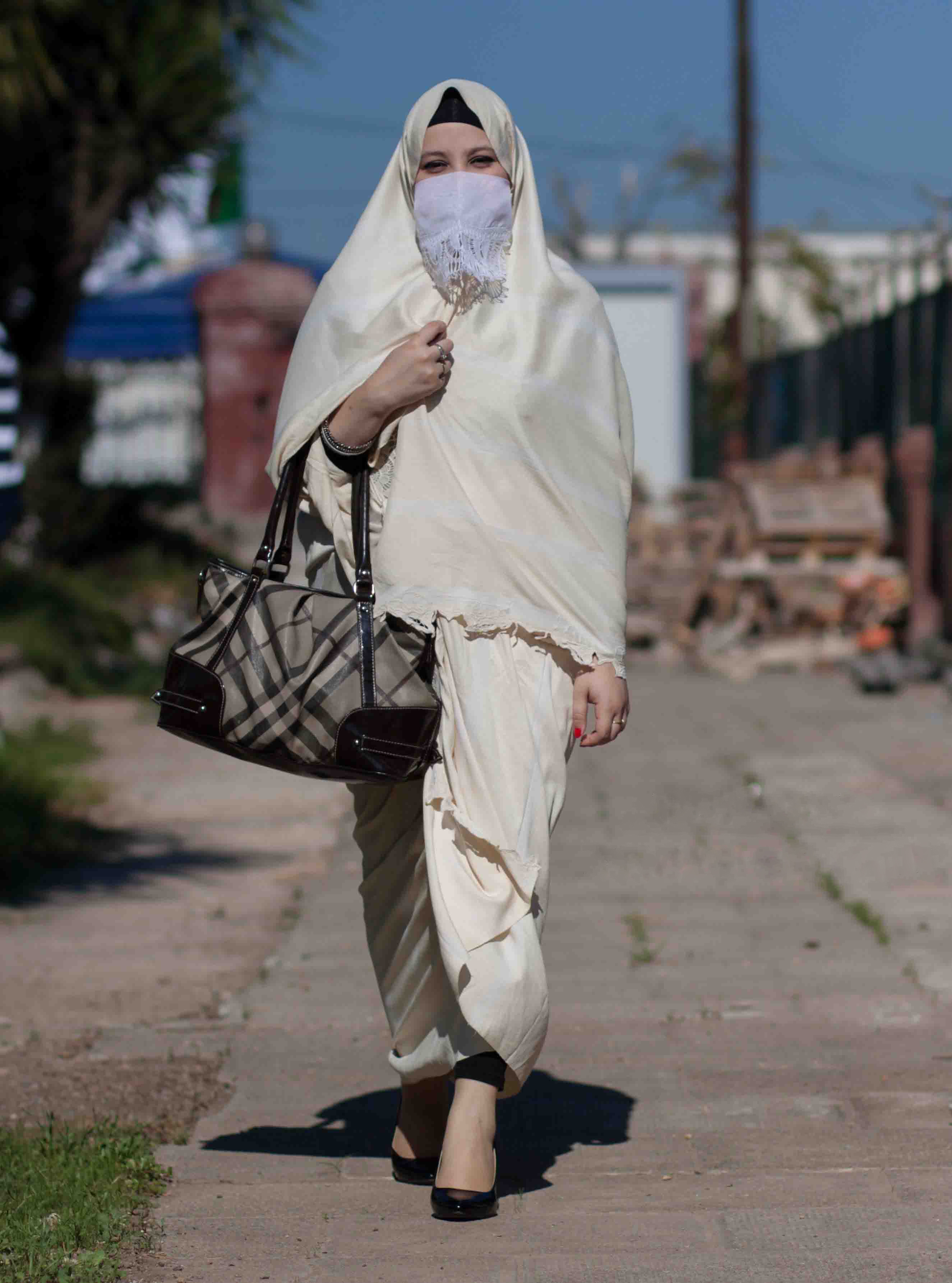
Woman wearing a haik in Algiers

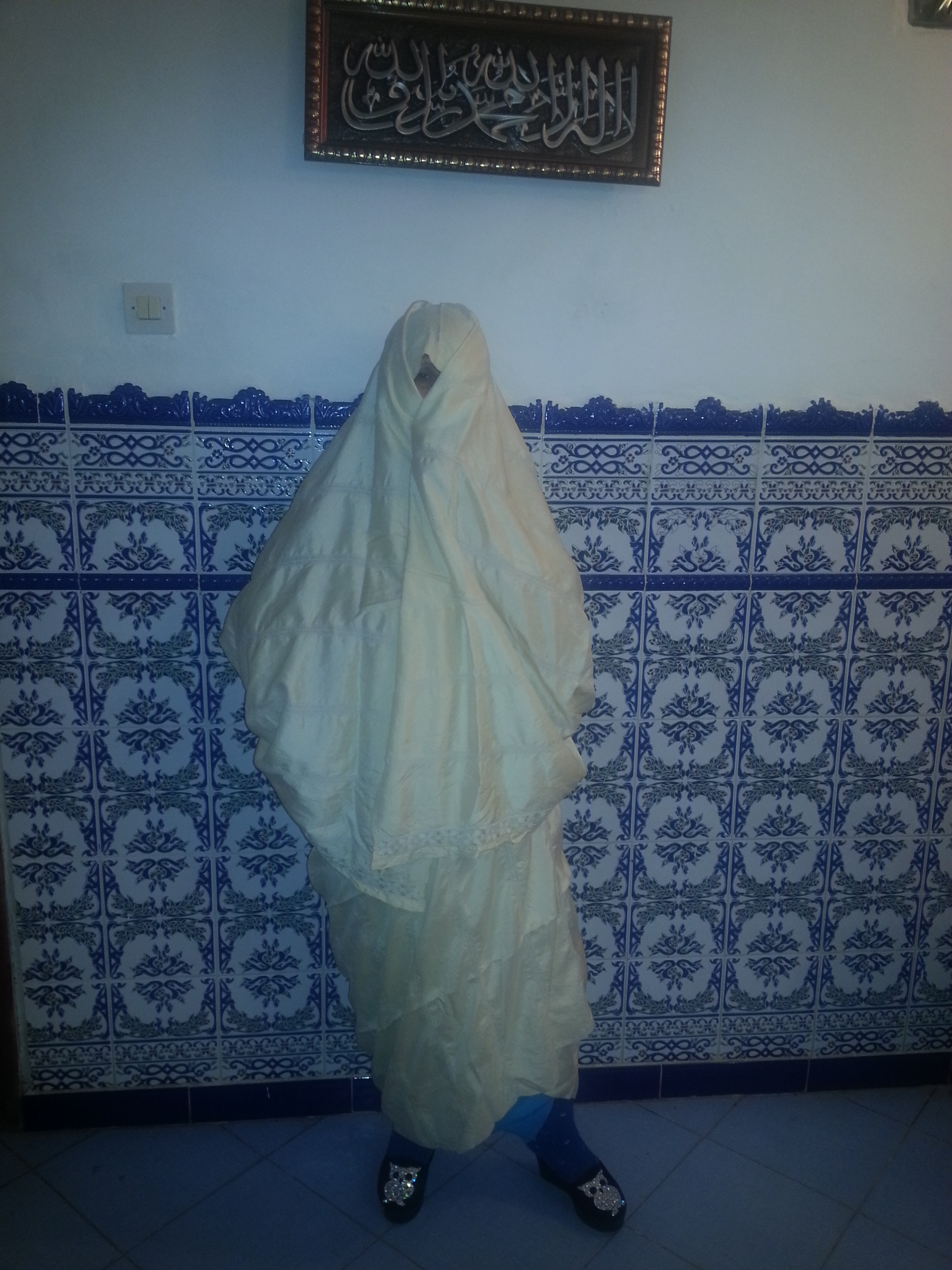
Haik from the Mascara region

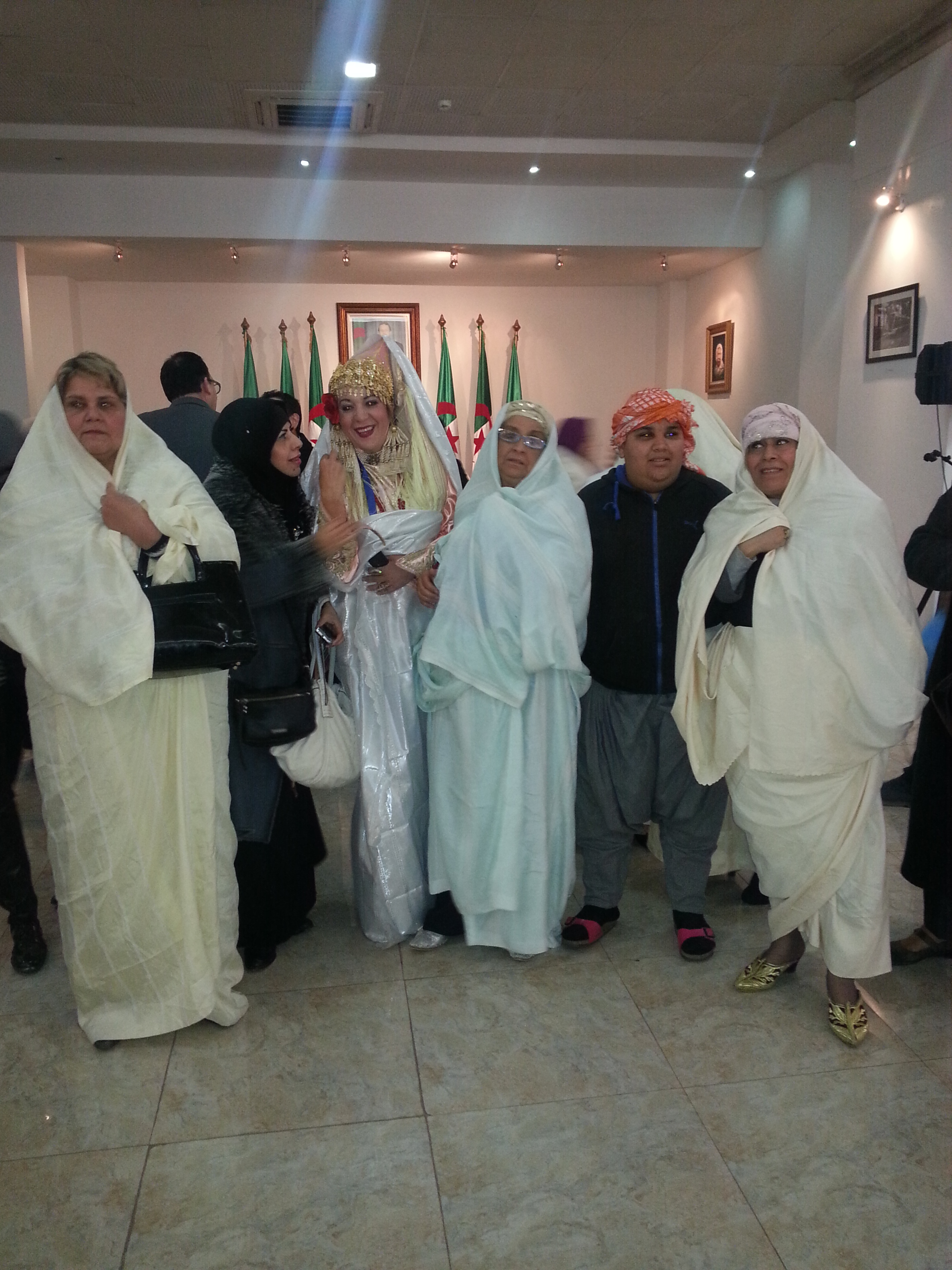
Haik from Oran

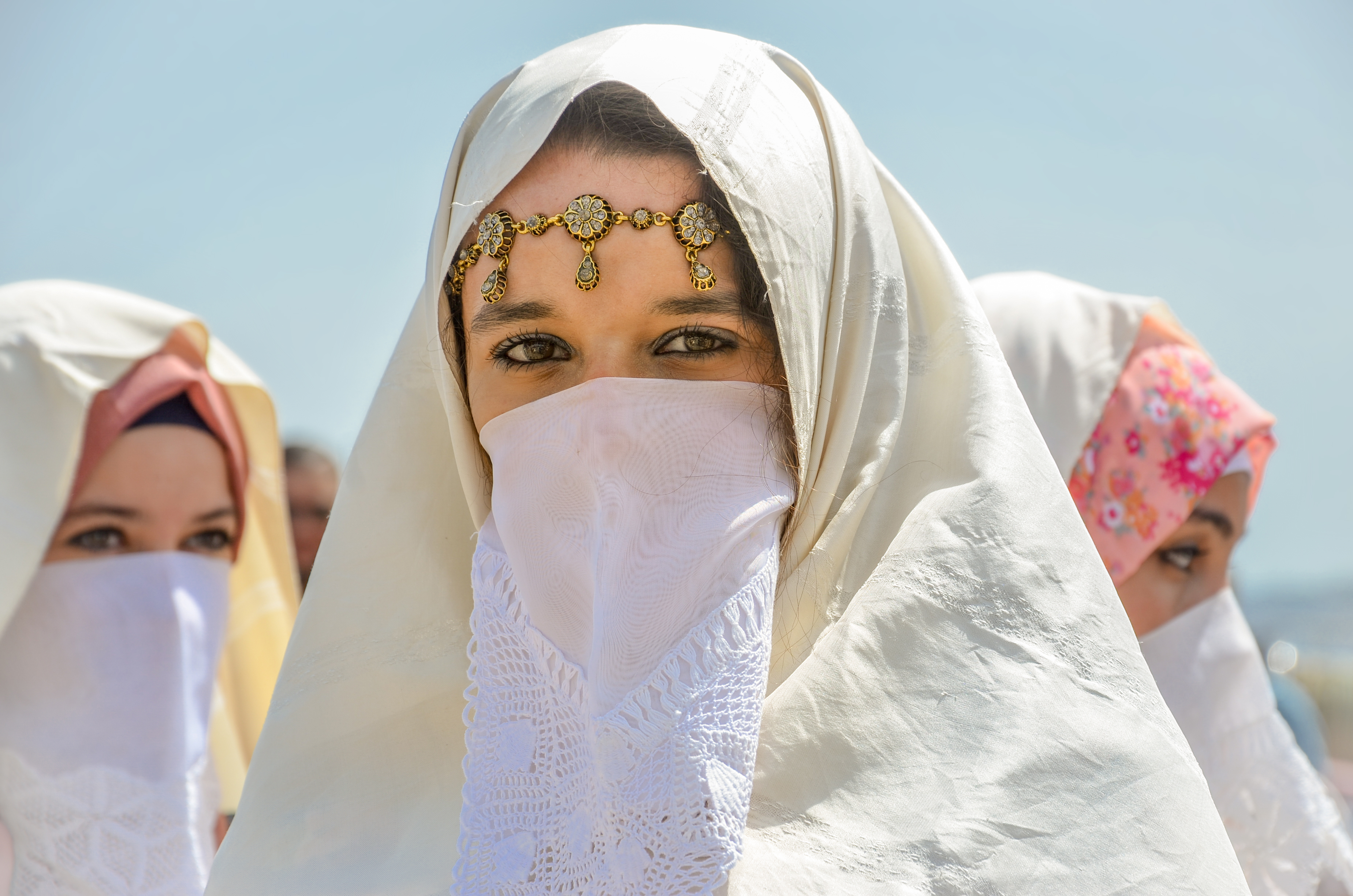
Algerian women wearing haiks

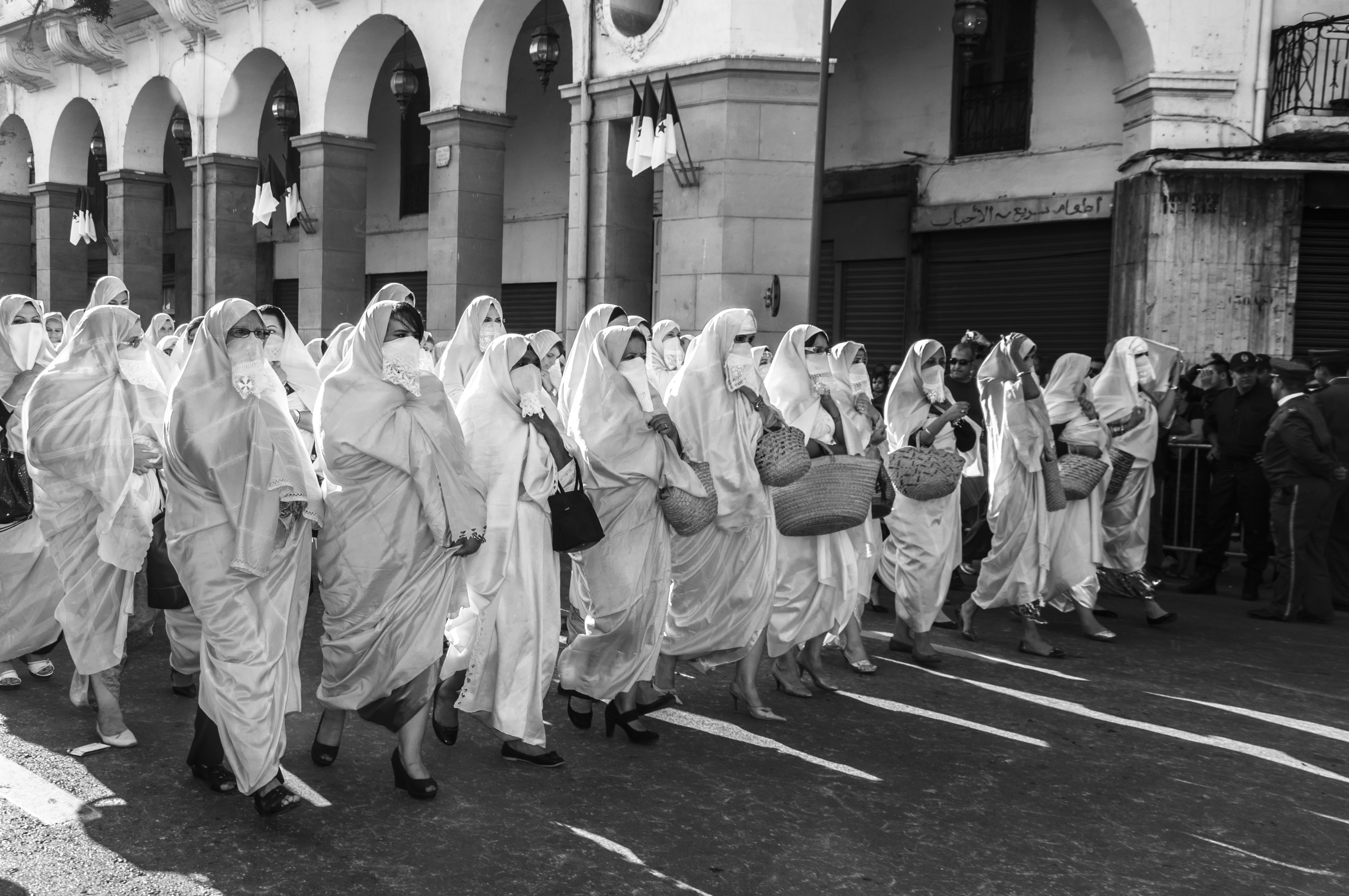
Algerian women wearing haiks during a demonstration in Algiers

== See also ==
- Traditional clothing of Algeria
- M'laya
- Algerian culture
- Veil
- Huik
