= Khit errouh =

Algerian jewelry

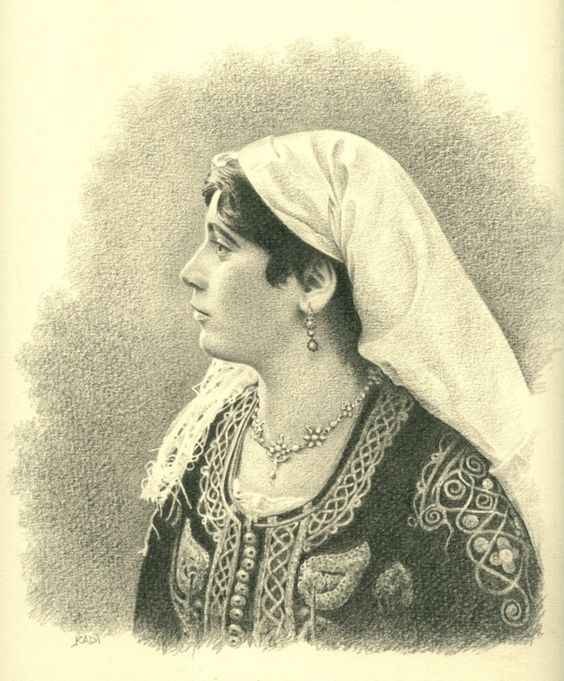
- Algerine woman (from Algiers) wearing a rosette Khit er rouh around her neck and a Karakou vest (c. 1880)
- Alternative names: Khit errouh, Khit er rouh, Zerouf
- Place of origin: Algeria

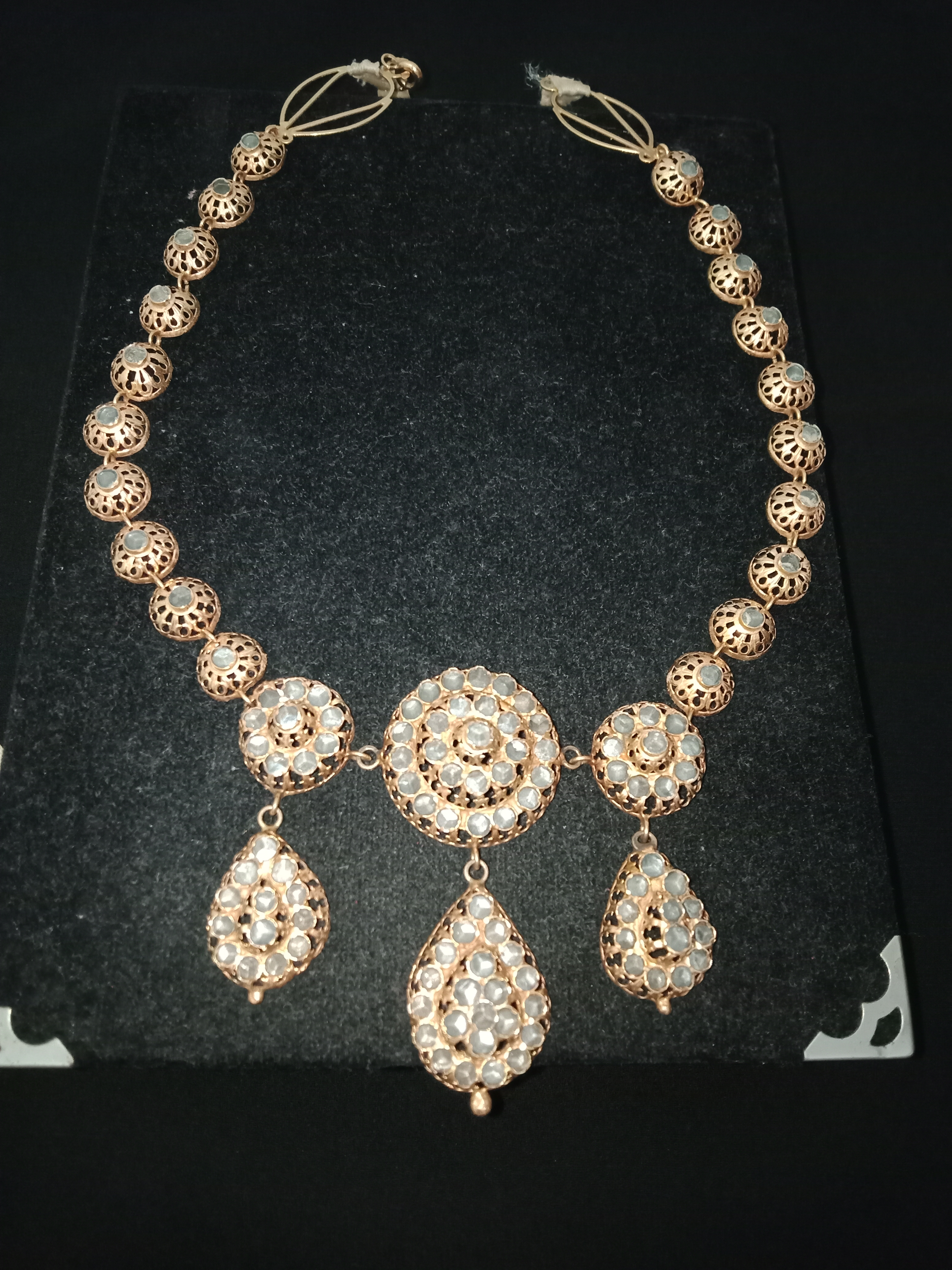
Khit errouh with three tears.

Khit er rouh, also known as Zerouf, is a type of Algerian diadem or headband made up of nineteen carved chatons linked together by rings, forming rosettes or rosaces and zerraref pendeloques made of gold set with diamonds or other precious stones. It is worn across the forehead with traditional outfits like the Karakou, where it is worn with a pair of earrings encrusted with tiny gemstones and several strands of baroque pearls. This Algerian accessory was inscribed in 2012 in the UNESCO, as an Intangible Heritage Of Humanity, along with The Algerian Kaftan and Chedda Of Tlemcen.

It is also worn with the Chedda of Tlemcen, accompanied by other ornaments such as the djébin, and can be worn around the neck.

The diadem is the favorite jewel of Algerian women, and it still accompanies the bridal outfit today. It is adorned with precious stones by wealthy city dwellers but does not serve to designate their social status. Women in Tlemcen wear three or four superimposed diadems.

Some models were made up of an assembly of diamonds forming rosettes of rubies and emeralds set in silver or gold opercula.

It is a millennia-old jewel that is part of the trousseau of the Algerian bride-to-be and can also be demanded as a dowry. It is passed down from mother to daughter, so some families in Algiers possess very ancient and therefore very expensive "khit er rouh".

== History ==
Originally from the city of Algiers, the Khiterrouh was worn under another gold diadem called Açaba (in Arabic: عصّابة "ʿAṣṣāba"), formed of hinged plates, in the shape of an inverted escutcheon, adorned with quivering pins.

During the 20th century, it became the only head jewel of the capital in Algiers. It was very successful in other Algerian cities and in some mountain villages, such as Aurès. Khit errouh has also recently been imported from Algeria to Morocco where it also became very popular.

Numerous examples are preserved in Algeria, particularly at the National Museum of Antiquities and Islamic Arts and at the National Museum of Popular Arts and Traditions.

== Image gallery ==
Women wearing khit errouh

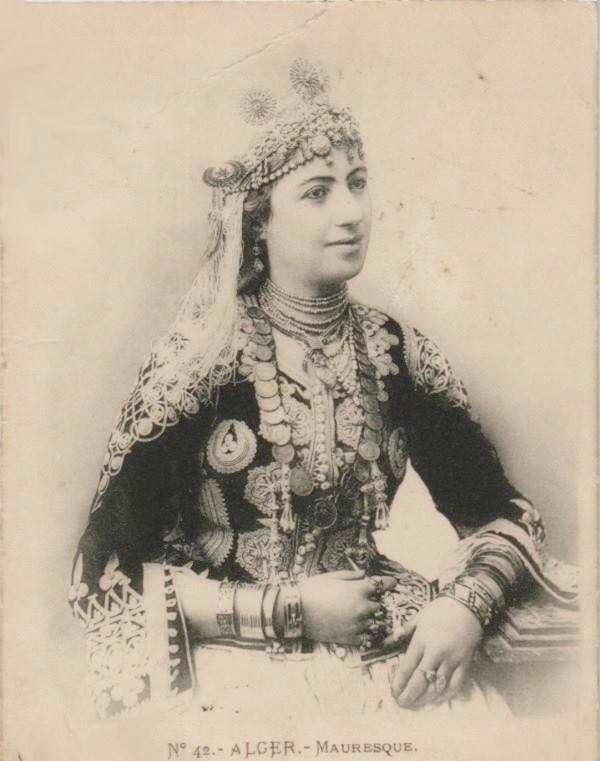

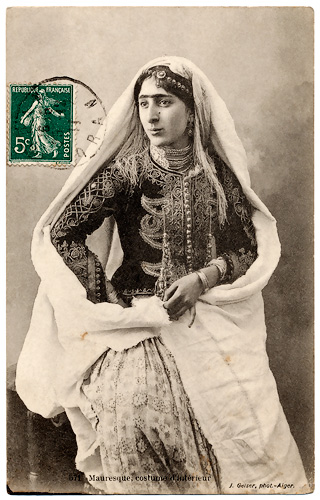

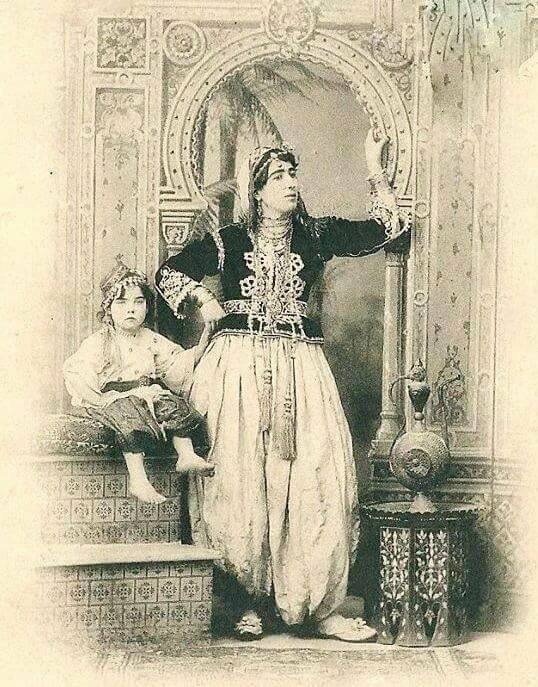

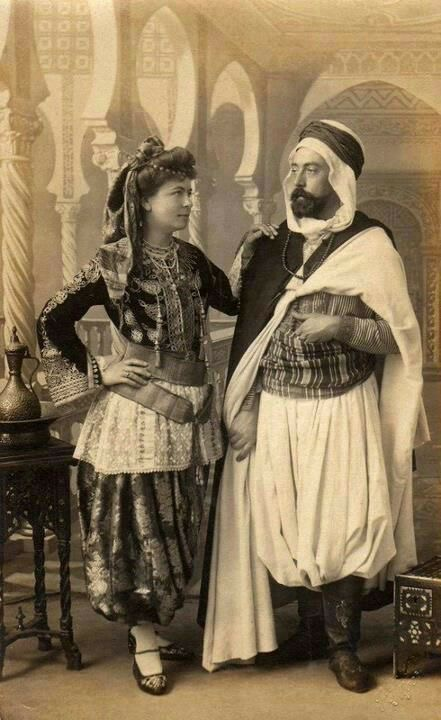

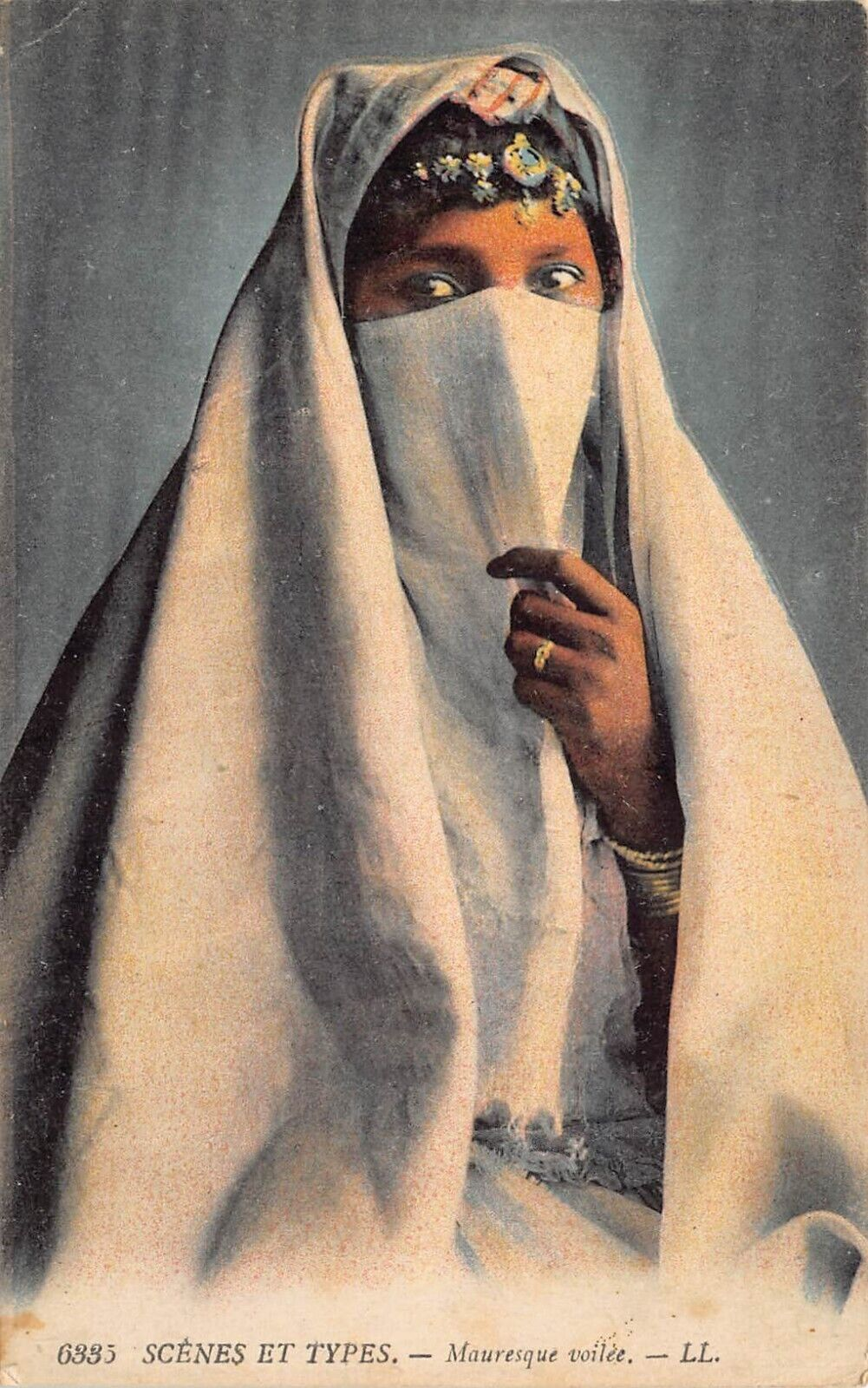

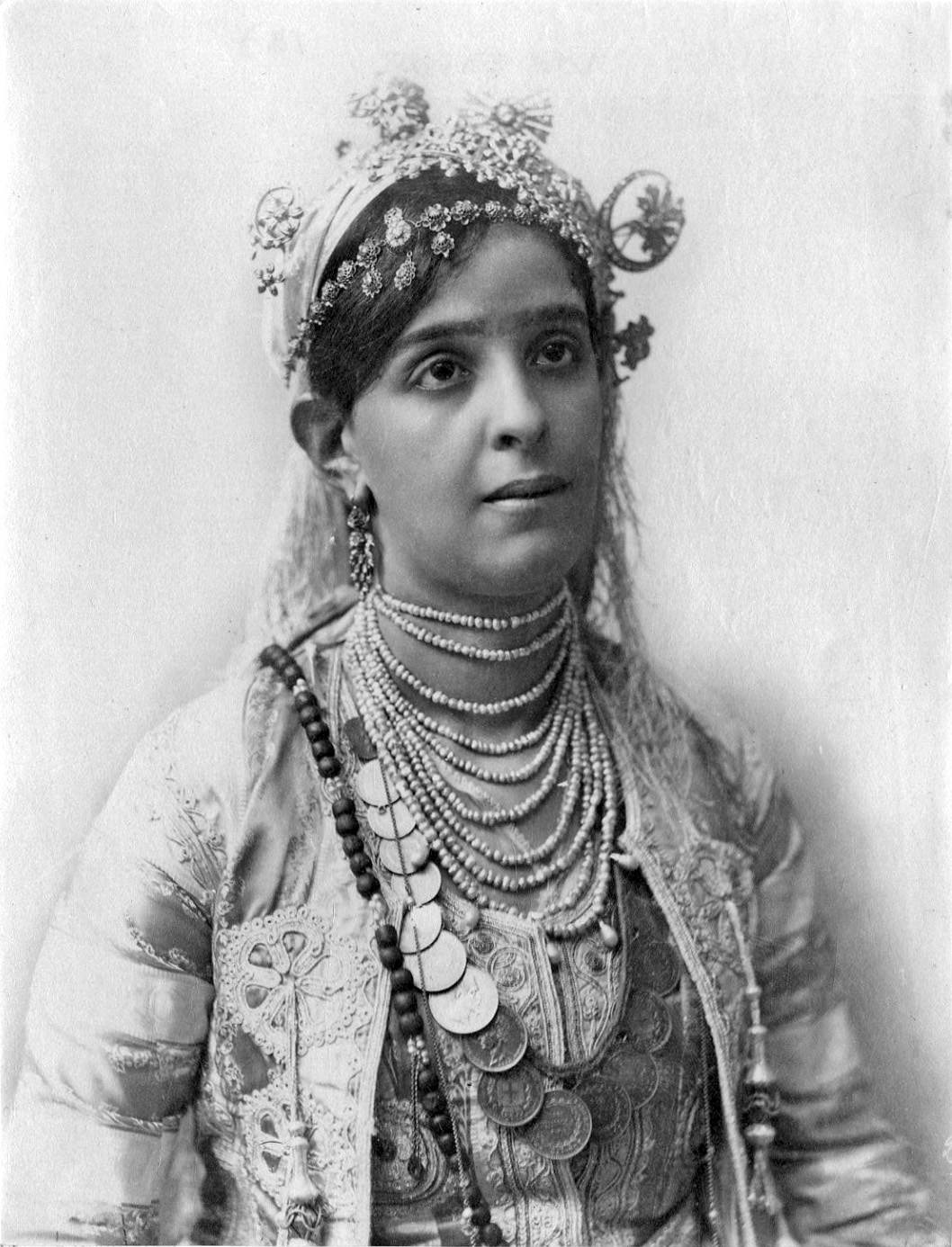
