= Djebba fergani =

Algerian clothing

- Type: Algerian clothing
- Material: Velvet
- Place of origin: Algeria

The women’s ceremonial costume in the Eastern region of Algeria: knowledge and skills associated with the making and adornment of the 'Gandoura' and the 'Melehfa'
- UNESCO Intangible Cultural Heritage
- Country: Algeria
- Reference: 02139
- Region: Arab States

Inscription history
- Inscription: 2024 (19th session)
- List: Representative

A djebba fergani or gandoura is a traditional long velvet dress adorned with elaborate embroidery, originating in Constantine, Algeria. It is made from black or burgundy velvet and features elaborate golden embroidery. It is also worn in Tizi Ouzou, where it is typically made using cotton.

The dress is frequently adorned with majboud, golden Algerian embroidery that has been named an Intangible Cultural Heritage by UNESCO, along with the melhfa and the wedding costume of Tlemcen.

== Image gallery ==
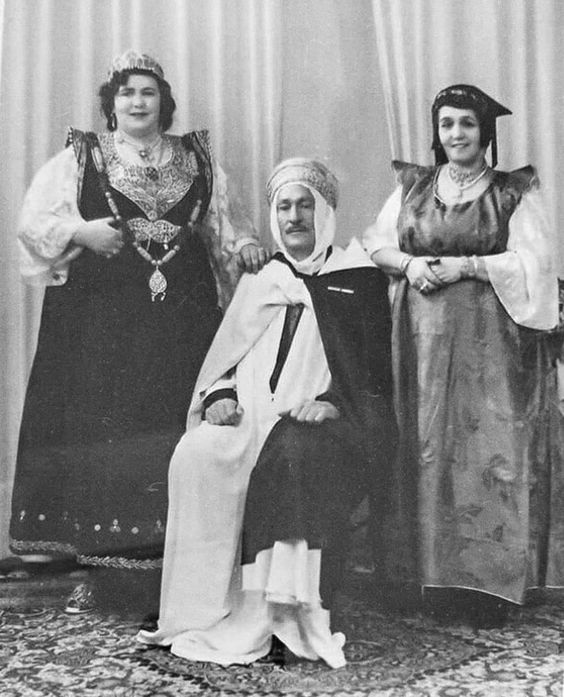
Old picture of a woman (on the left) wearing the Djebba fergani (Gandoura of Constantine).

== See also ==
- Ghlila
- Karakou
- Frimla
- Bniqa
