= Qashabiya =

Algerian traditional garment

- Material: Camel hair and wool
- Place of origin: Algeria

The qashabiya (Tamazight: ⵜⴰⵇⴻⵛⵛⴰⴱⵉⵜ, romanized: Taqshabit, Arabic: القشابية) is a traditional Algerian winter garment. It is traditionally considered of Berber origin. It features a hood and differs from the burnous by the presence of sleeves and a closure. Thicker and wider than the Djellaba (الجلابة), it is made of camel wool. It allows its wearer to brave the wind and precipitation of winter.

It also holds significant importance in the Algerian collective memory, as it, along with the burnous, represents the attire of the shuhada during the Algerian War of National Liberation. It also has the reputation of being Algeria's national attire.

== Etymology ==
According to Georges Séraphin Colin, the term "qeššabiya" used in central and eastern Algeria is a deformation of the Latin gausapa, a term that would have been preserved in the form of gosaba in the Adrar, where it refers to a shirt.

Arabic dictionaries list several definitions and etymologies for the term qashabiya, although they all agree in designating a garment but differ in its characteristics.

== Origin ==
The Qashabiya, a characteristic garment symbol of the High Plateaus of Algeria, is mainly crafted in the heart of Djelfa and its surroundings. It can also be found in the eastern regions of Morocco, the Aurès, Tunisia, and even as far as Tripolitania.

The qashabiya is associated with the mujahideen who fought during the Algerian War of Independence. The qashabiya was crucial in helping Algerian guerrillas withstand the harsh cold in the mountains while also allowing them to blend into their surroundings for camouflage. Nowadays the region of the Ouled Nail is renowned for crafting and wearing the qashabiya.

== Fabrication ==
The Qashabiya is still made by tailors in Sétif, particularly in the district of "At Tarazoun" (الطرازون) street. This traditional industry is however threatened by lack of transmission to the youngest.

In the Djelfa region, a camel wool fabric called Ouabri is made. This fabric is used in the making of a wide range of Qashabiya and Burnous Ouabri. These two garments are in high demand today, particularly the Qashabiya Ouabri. In addition, the fabric of the fabric adapts well to other garments, particularly modern outfits.

== See also ==
- Burnous
- Algerian Kaftan
- Chedda of Tlemcen
