= Sarma (hat) =

Algerian clothing

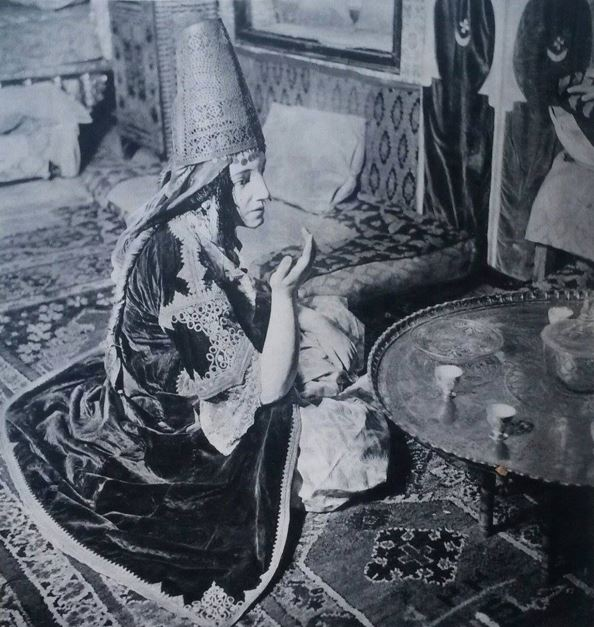
- Algerian woman wearing a Sarma
- Type: Algerian clothing
- Material: Gold or silver
- Place of origin: Algiers

The Sarma or Serma is a cone-shaped metallic headdress that originated in Algiers.

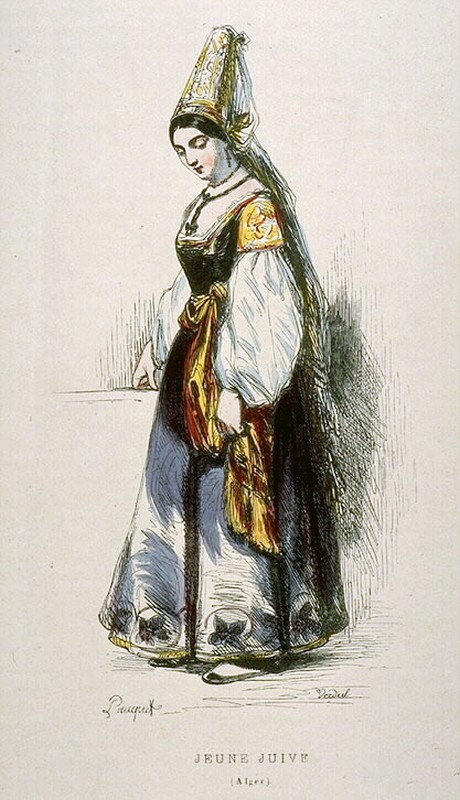
Algerian Jewish woman wearing a Sarma

The Sarma was mostly worn by Algerian women during the Ottoman period in Algeria. The Sarma is composed of two parts, the first being a truncated and hollow half-cone which is held against the head by thin scarves or bands and resting on the forehead. The second part is used to contain the hair and consists of a thin silver plate pierced with arabesque motifs.

Stephen D’Estry observed that the headdress of the Jewish women of Algiers, the Sarma, resembled a cone shape and was adorned with a transparent veil enriched with embroidery.

== See also ==
- Bniqa
- Ghlila
- Karakou
- Djebba Fergani
