= Djellaba =

Type of robe worn in Maghreb, North Africa

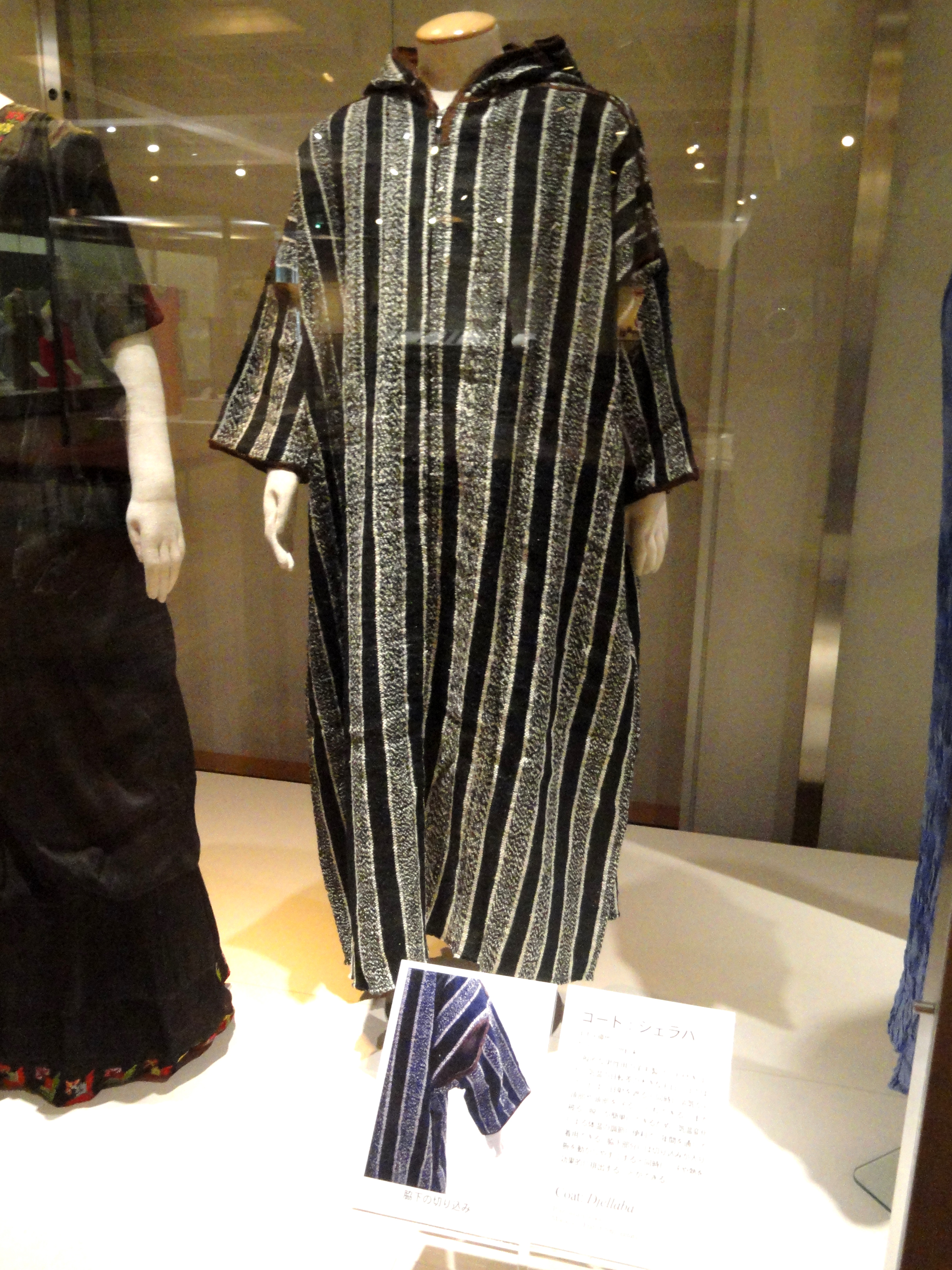
Djellaba

The djellaba or jillaba (/dʒɪˈlɑːbə/; Arabic: جلابة), also written gallabea, is a long, loose-fitting unisex outer robe or dress with long sleeves that is worn in North Africa.

In central and eastern Algeria it is called a qashabiya (qeššaba or qeššabiya). The mountain dwellers of Morocco call it tadjellabit, which is a Berberized form.

== Etymology ==
The word djellaba is French derived from the Arabic jallāba, a variant of jallābīya (originally meaning "garment worn by traders"); from jallāb, trader or importer; ultimately from jalaba, to bring, attract, fetch or import.

Reinhart Dozy's theory that the djellaba would have been, originally, the "garment of the djellab", that is to say of the slave trader, has been rejected by William Marçais who proposed to see in djellaba an alteration of djilbab which, in ancient Arabic, meant draped clothing, although the djellaba is sewn rather than draped. He pointed out that in Oman the form gillab designates the woman's veil. The disappearance of the first b would have occurred identically in the Maghreb and Oman. As for the qeššabiya, Georges Séraphin Colin sees in this name the deformation of the Latin gausapa, a term which would have been preserved in the gosaba form in the Adrar where it designates the shirt.

== Overview ==
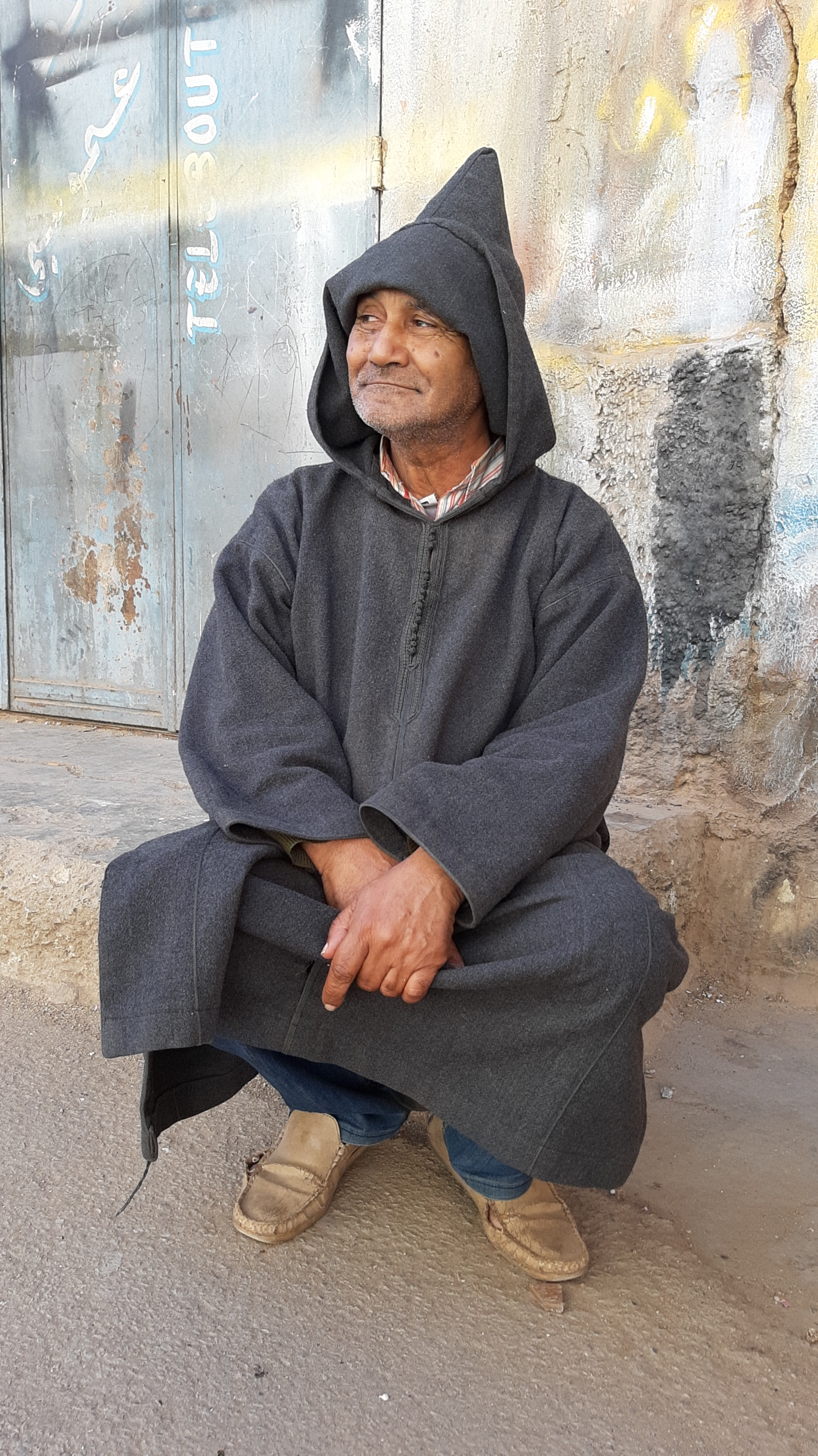
Moroccan man wearing a djellaba

Traditionally, djellabas are made of wool in different shapes and colours, but lightweight cotton djellabas have now become popular. Among the Berbers, or Imazighen, such as the Imilchil in the Atlas Mountains, the colour of a djellaba traditionally indicates the marital status (single or married) of the bearer: a dark brown djellaba indicating bachelorhood.

Traditionally, djellabas reached down to the ground but lightweight djellabas are somewhat slimmer and shorter. Men often wear a light-coloured djellaba sometimes along with a traditional Arab red fez hat and soft yellow babouche slippers (balgha in Arabic) for religious celebrations and weddings.

In the Hammadid period, djellabas were produced in the Qal'at Bani Hammad. These djellabas were composed of a robe, a tunic and a shirt. Djellabas were also produced in Ottoman Algeria where the textile production played a central role in the traditional economy.

Almost all djellabas of both styles (male or female) include a baggy hood called a qob (Arabic: قب) that comes to a point at the back. The hood is important for both sexes, as it protects the wearer from the sun, and in earlier times, it was used as a defence against sand being blown into the wearer's face by strong desert winds. In colder climes, as in the mountains of Morocco, it also serves the same function as a winter hat, preventing heat loss through the head and protecting the face from snow and rain. It is common for the roomy hood to be used as a pocket during times of warm weather; it can fit loaves of bread or bags of groceries.

Traditional djellabas are generally made of two types of material, cotton for summer wear and coarse wool for the winter. The wool is typically obtained from sheep in the surrounding mountains. Buttons for djellabas are made in the town of Bhalil.

== Symbolism ==
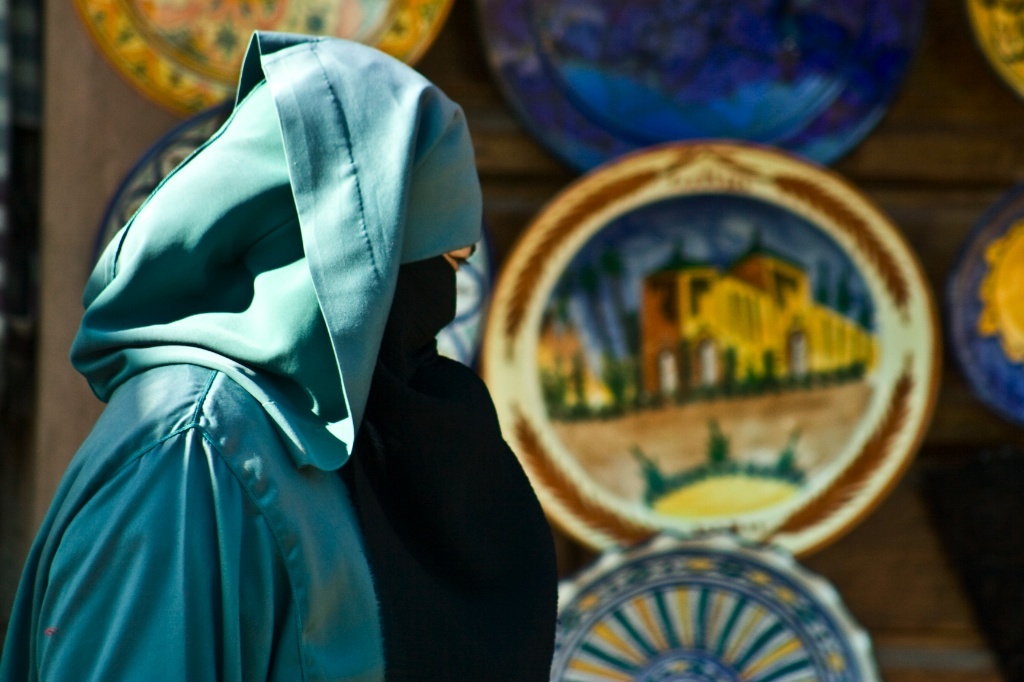
Moroccan woman wearing a djellaba

Moroccan women began wearing the djellaba rather than the haik under the French protectorate as a symbol of Moroccan nationalism.

== See also ==
- Burnous
- Jellabiya
- Abaya
- Jilbāb
- Kaftan
- Dashiki
- Tallit
