= Birrus =

Cloak or hood in Britain and Gaul

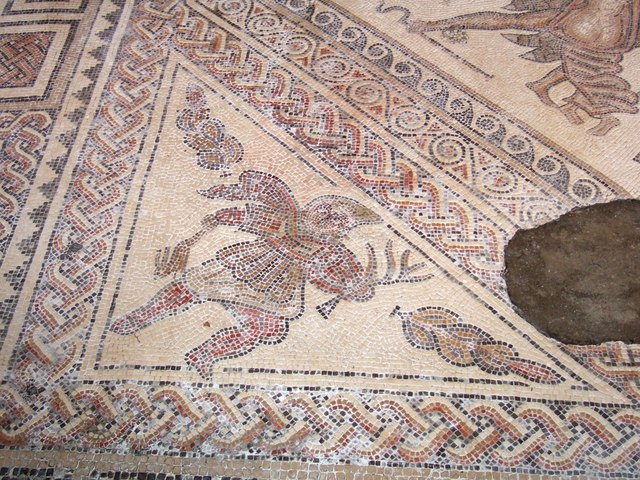
Mosaic floor, Chedworth. The figure in this image is wearing a Birrus Britannicus or hooded cloak.

A birrus or birrus brittanicus was a rainproof, hooded woollen cloak (or simply a hood alone), characteristically worn in Britain and Gaul at the time of the Roman Empire and into the Middle Ages.

A mosaic at Chedworth Roman Villa shows a Briton wearing a birrus brittanicus; there is also one shown on a statue of a ploughman at the British Museum.

== See also ==
- Burnous
