= Takshita =

Moroccan traditional women's garment

The takshita (Berber: ⵜⴽⵛⵉⵟⴰ, Arabic: تَكْشِيْطَة, alternate spellings: taqchita, tackshita, tackchita) is a Moroccan traditional women's garment that, like the Moroccan kaftan, is worn for celebrations, particularly weddings.

== Structure ==
The takshita is composed of two pieces, a dress as a first layer called tahtiya, often of fine but not ornately decorated fabric, and a more elaborate second layer or over-dress that often buttons up the front using the traditional sfifa and akaad closures and it is called dfina. The upper layer is often richly adorned with embroidery, beading or sequins. Some women wear their takshita belted, with a m'damma which can also be richly adorned and usually matches the dfina.

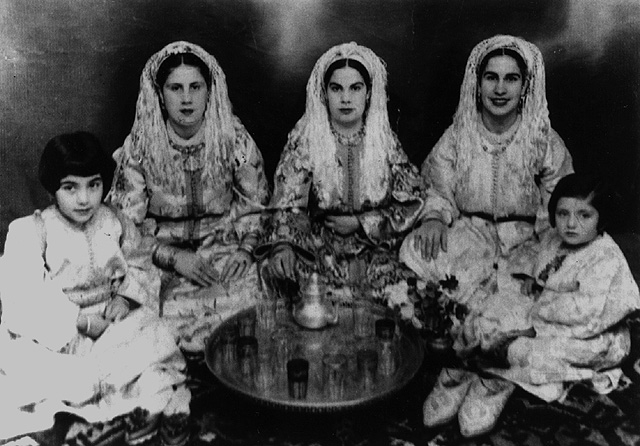
Moroccan women wearing takchita

== Modern interpretations ==
Modern interpretations of traditional Moroccan clothing, particularly the takchita, kaftan and djellaba are exhibited at the annual Caftan fashion show in Morocco and hosted by the Moroccan fashion magazine Femmes du Maroc. Hillary Clinton wore a takshita at a state dinner for the king of Morocco in 2000.

== See also ==
- Jellaba
- Jellabiya
