= Bniqa =

Algerian clothing

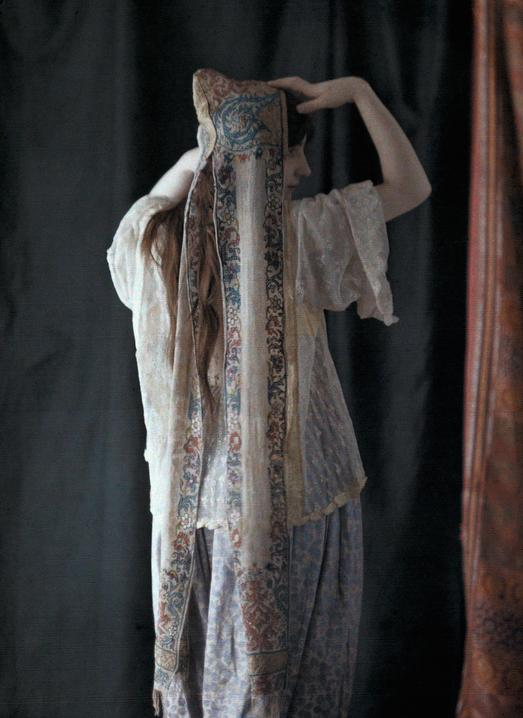
- Type: Algerian clothing
- Material: Silk
- Place of origin: Algiers

The Bniqa is an embroidered shower cap that originated in Algiers.

The Bniqa is a traditional Algerian shower cap, it is embroidered with silk and gold threads. The shower cap is used to dry the hair after bathing. The borders and the ends of the Bniqa typically feature golden embroiderey.

== See also ==
• Ghlila
• Frimla
• Karakou
• Sarma (hat)
