= Chedda of Tlemcen =

Traditional Algerian women's costume

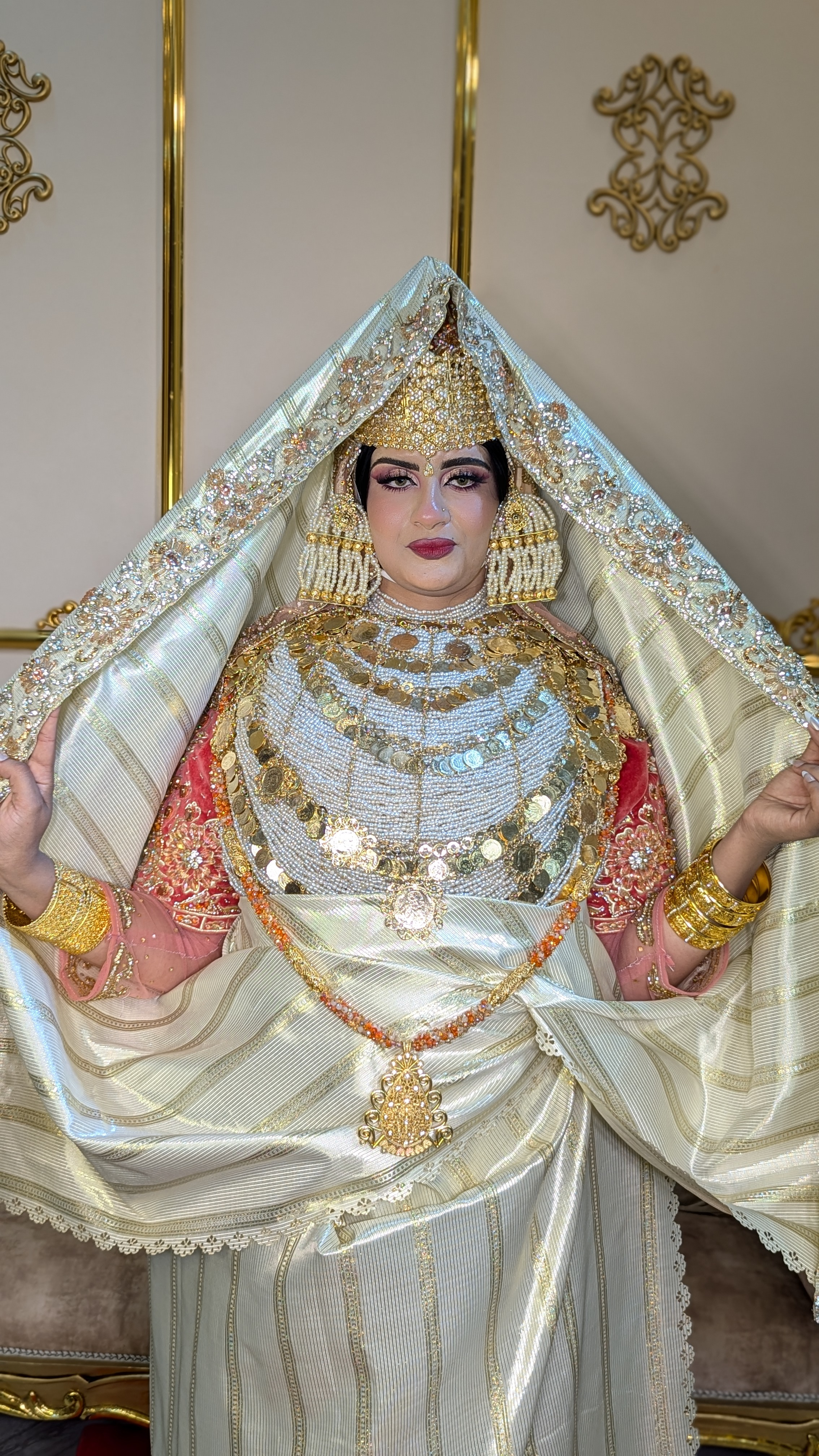
- Type: Wedding dress
- Material: Kaftan of velvet and gold thread
- Place of origin: Tlemcen, Algeria

Rites and craftsmanship associated with the wedding costume tradition of Tlemcen
- UNESCO Intangible Cultural Heritage
- Country: Algeria
- Reference: 00668
- Region: Arab States

Inscription history
- Inscription: 2012 (7th session)
- List: Representative

The chedda of Tlemcen (/ˈʃɛdə/; Arabic: شدة تلمسانية, romanized: Shadda Tlimsānīa) is a traditional Algerian dress, more precisely of the city of Tlemcen, but also worn in the west of the country, in particular in Oran and Mostaganem. A product of the local craftsmanship, it is worn by brides in Tlemcen for their wedding ceremony.

== Description ==
The chedda consists of a traditional kaftan of velvet and gold thread, decorated with cultured pearls, necklaces, meskia and graffache.^{[explain]} Khorsa (kind of earrings that "fall" from the temples) and huge earrings hang from a conical cap embroidered with gold thread and placed on the head of the bride.

The dress is considered as the most expensive and the most beautiful dress that the bride wears on the day of her wedding, but also the other women at weddings. This garment is worn by brides with other jewels such as djouhar cultured pearls, meskia hanging necklaces, a pair of kholkhal rings wrapped around the ankle, in addition to the bracelets. The head is capped with a conical chechia embroidered with gold thread on which is knotted the mendil of mensoudj, a kind of scarf with seven to nine diadems. Including zerrouf (tiara), djebel (diadem) and other ornaments.

Since 2012, the traditional rites and craftsmanship of the wedding costume in Tlemcen have been inscribed in the UNESCO Intangible Cultural Heritage of Humanity list.

== See also ==
• Algerian Kaftan
• Ghlila
• Karakou
• Sarma (hat)
