= Burnous =

Long woolen cloak with a hood, worn in North Africa

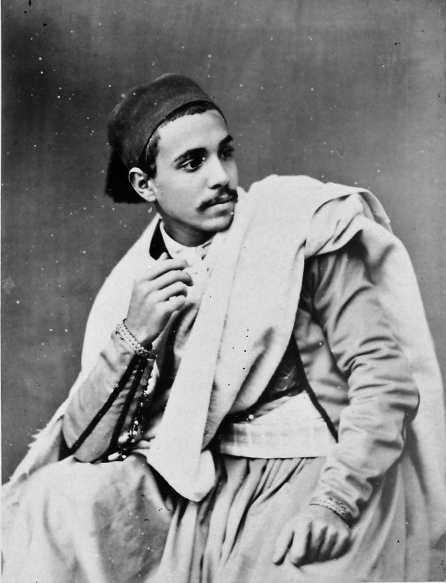
Urban Algerian man wearing a white/beige burnous, 19th century

A burnous (Tamazight: Abarnus, ⴰⴱⴰⵔⵏⵓⵙ), also burnoose, burnouse, bournous or barnous, is a long cloak of coarse woollen fabric with a pointed hood, often white, traditionally worn by Northwest African men. Historically, the white burnous was worn during important events by men of high positions. Today, men of different social standing may wear it for ceremonial occasions, such as weddings or on religious and national holidays.

== Origin ==
In antiquity this garment was referred to as byruss Numidicus meaning "Numidian hooded cloak" and was mentioned as such in the Expositio totius mundi et gentium. In the Maghreb, the colour of the burnous may be white, beige, or dark brown. The burnous was worn by the Numidians. There are rock engravings near Sigus that attest the existence of the burnous in the ancient times and that it was worn by the Numidians. Additionally, further examples can be observed in funerary monuments located in the area of Tigzirt.

== Cultural significance ==
=== In Algeria ===
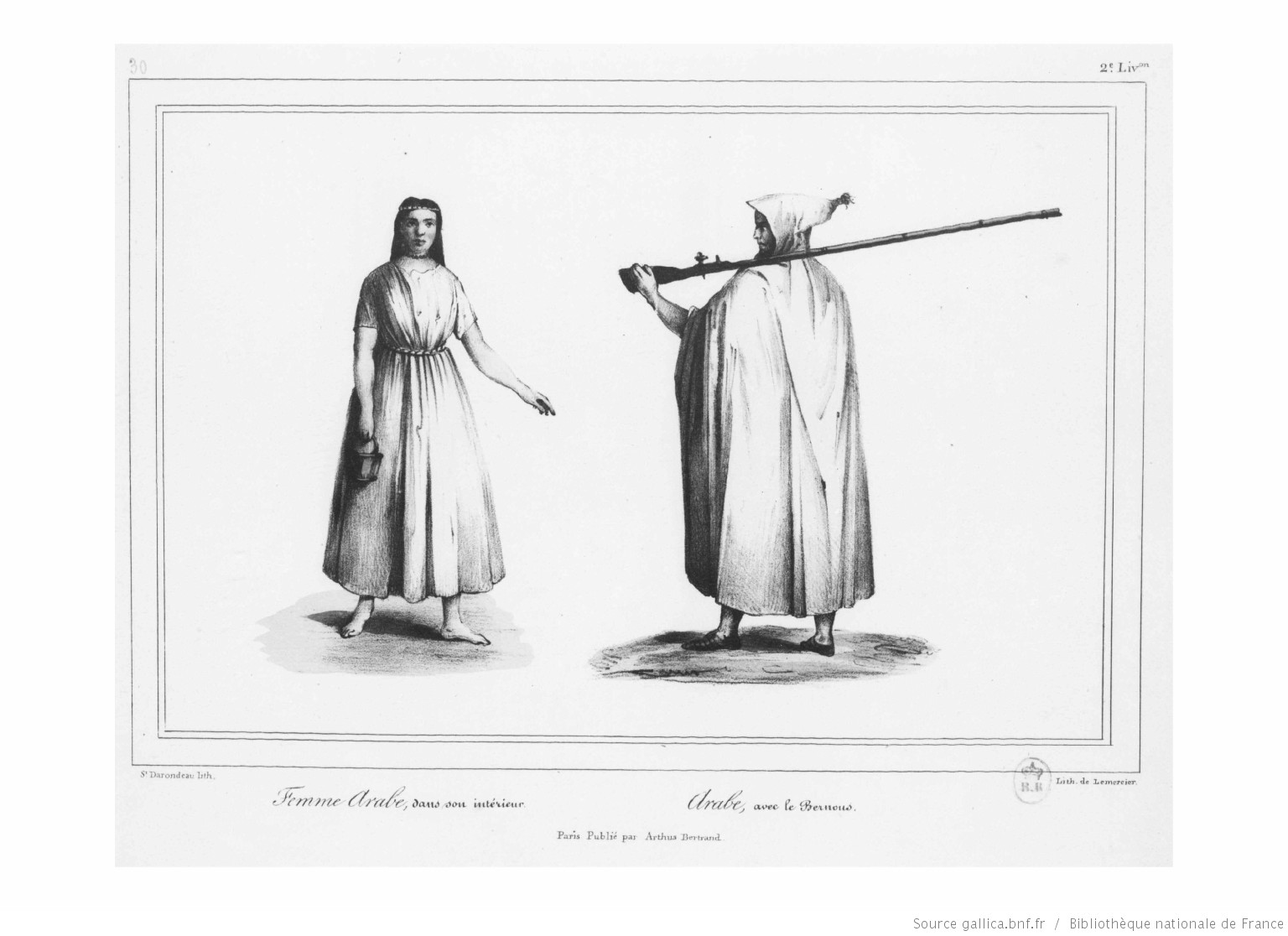
French Colonial era illustration of a North African man wearing a burnous (as well as a local woman), in the Regency of Algiers.

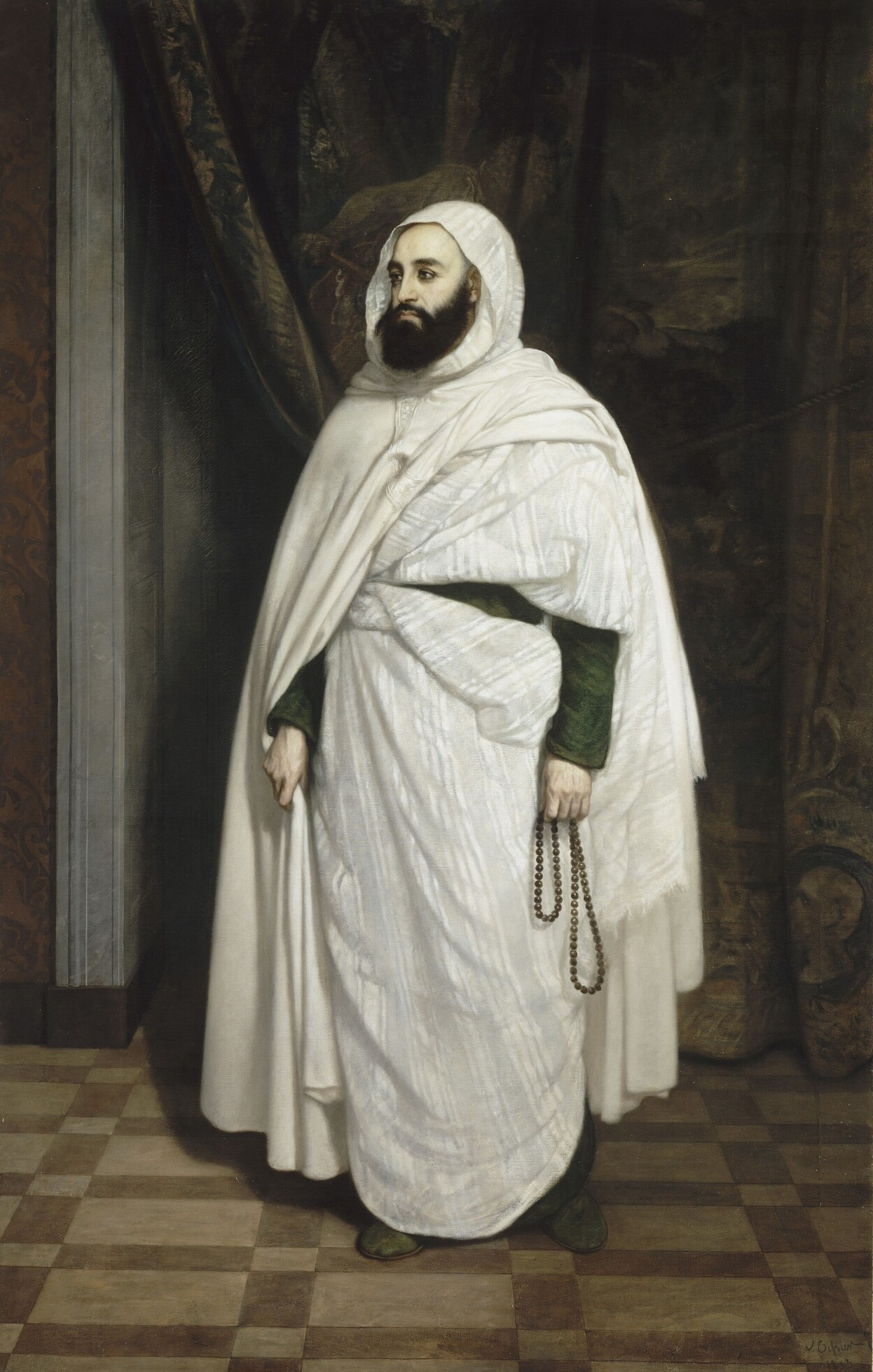
Algerian military leader Abd el-Kader wearing a burnous in 1853

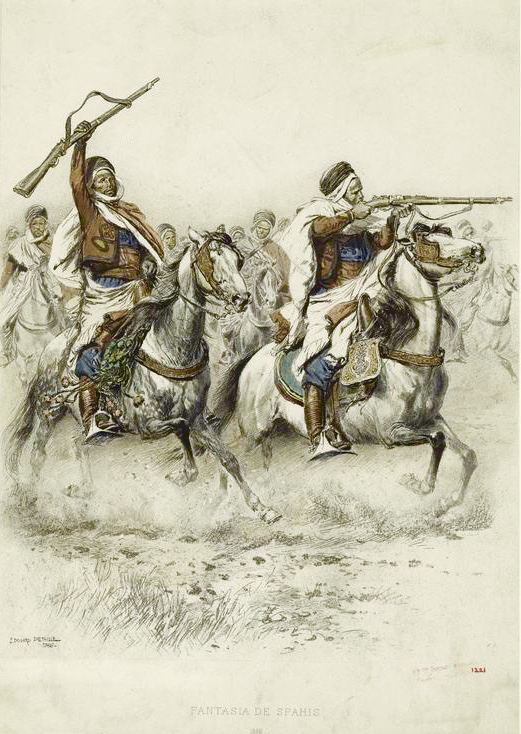
Algerian Spahis of the French army wearing the burnous as part of their uniform, 1886

During the French colonial period in Algeria (1830–1962), the burnous became a symbol of identity for Algerians. Many Algerians, including those who were not nomadic, began wearing the burnous as a way to assert their cultural heritage and resist French influence.

The burnous was also worn during the Algerian War of Independence (1954–1962), both as a symbol of resistance and as a practical garment for guerrilla fighters operating in the mountains and deserts.

Today, the burnous remains an important symbol of Algerian culture and identity. It is often worn on special occasions, such as weddings and religious festivals, and is sometimes used as a costume in traditional dance performances. It also forms part of the ceremonial uniform worn by the mounted cavalry detachment of the Algerian Republican Guard.

== Burnous in other cultures ==
The burnous became a distinctive part of the uniform of the French Army of Africa's spahi cavalry, recruited in Algeria, Morocco, and Tunisia. It was also sometimes worn unofficially by officers or soldiers of other units in North Africa. The white burnous remains part of the parade uniform of the one remaining spahi regiment of the French Army: the 1st Spahi Regiment.

Other names for a burnous include albornoz, sbernia, sberna, and bernusso.

== See also ==
- Birrus
- Bernos
- Kaftan
- Qashabiya
- Jelaba
- Qamis
