= Karakou =

Algerian clothing

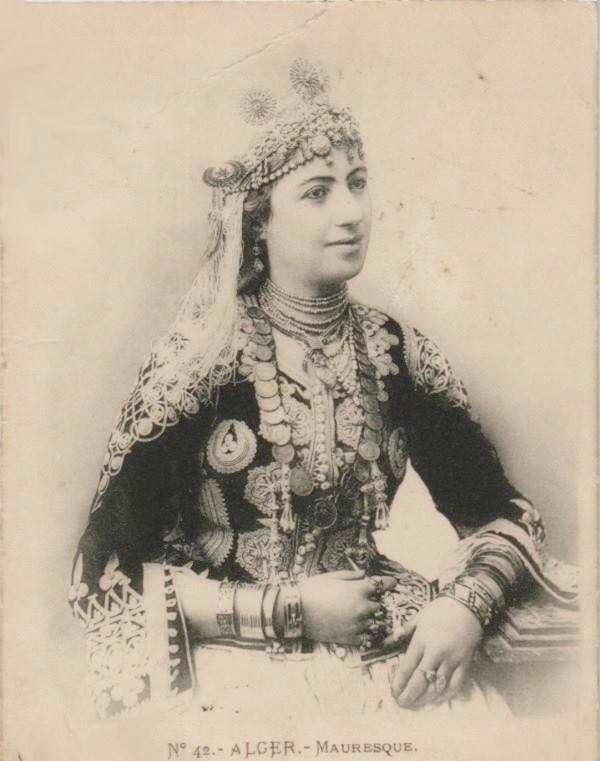
- Type: Algerian clothing
- Material: Velvet
- Place of origin: Algiers

The Karakou is a long-sleeved fitted velvet jacket embroidered with golden and silvered threads, it is a traditional Algerian garment originating from Algiers.

The Karakou was developed in the 19th century and is the evolution of the Algerian Ghlila which was part of the local dress of Algeria.

This Algerian vest is made by an Algerian Embroidery called El Majboud, which was inscribed in the UNESCO along with the Algerian Kaftan and Chedda Tlemcenia.

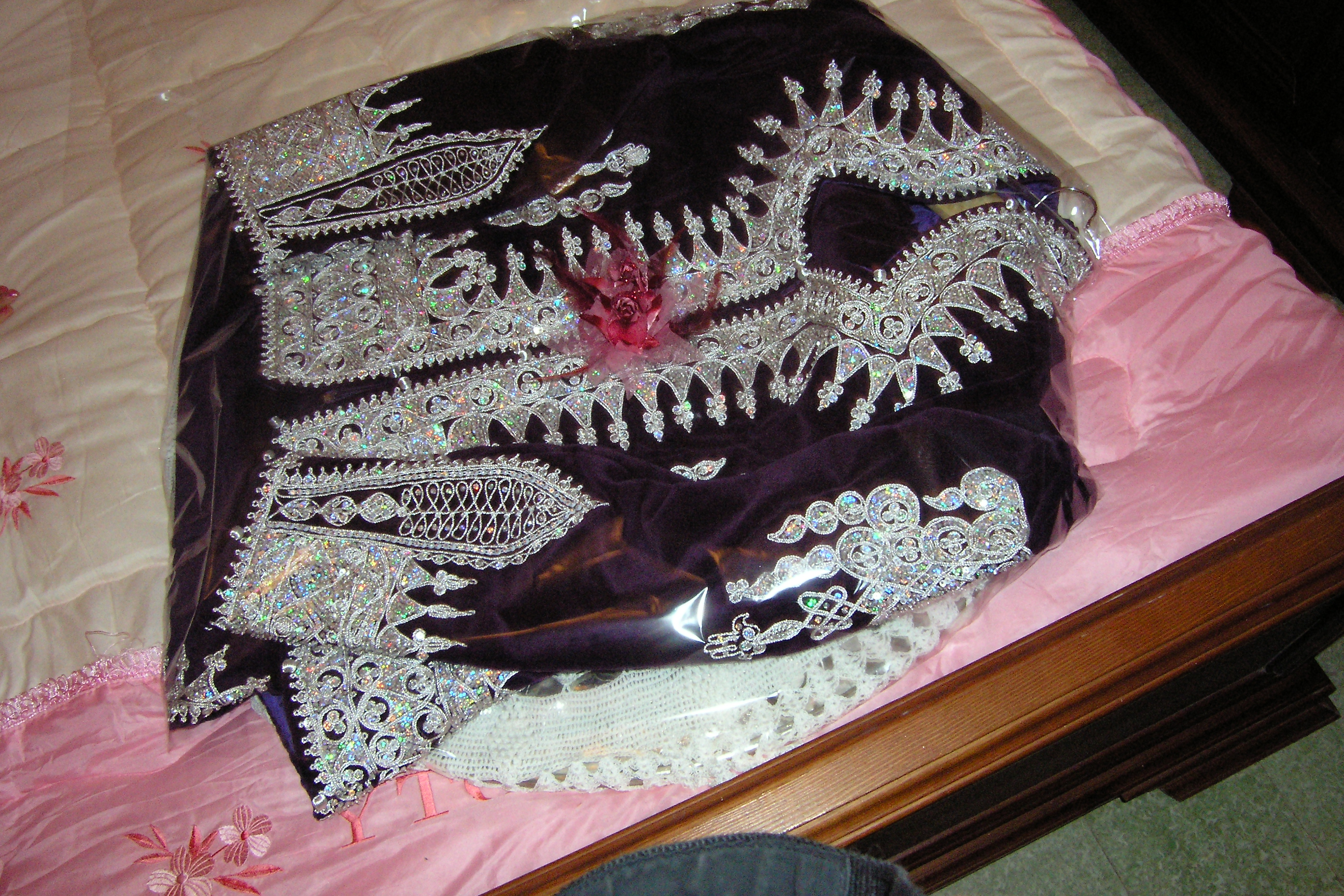
Algerian Karakou

== See also ==
• Ghlila
• Frimla
• Djebba Fergani
• Algerian Kaftan
