= Ghlila =

Algerian clothing

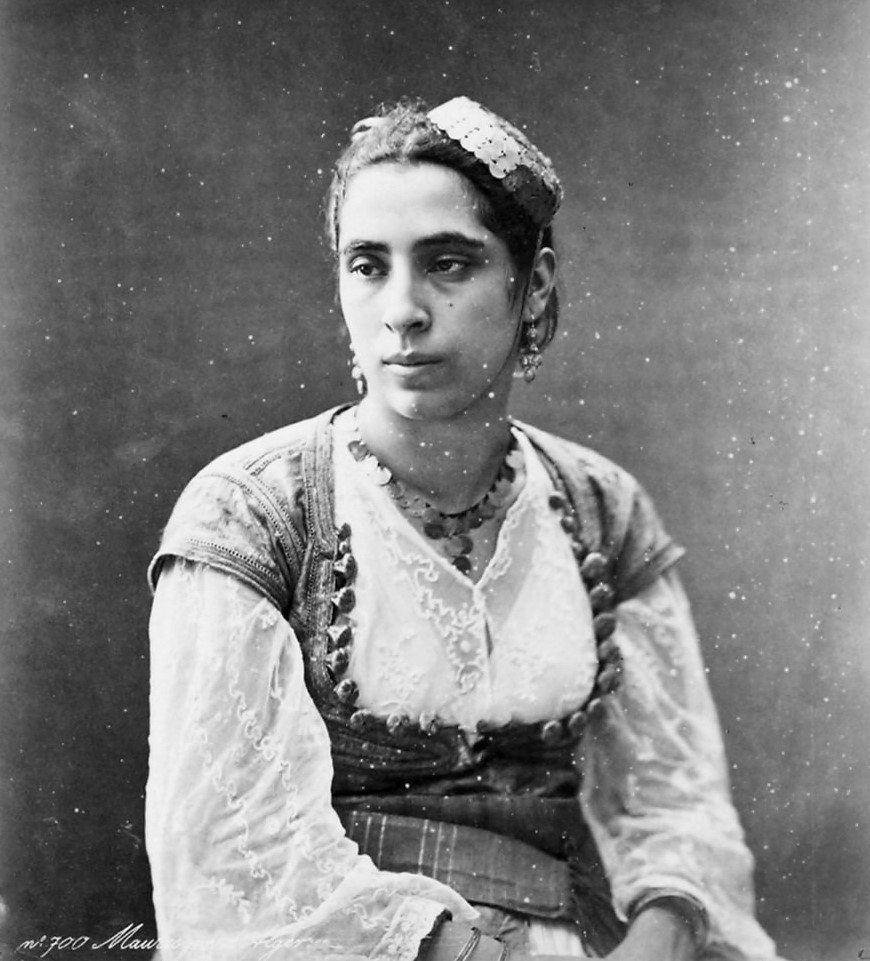
- Type: Algerian clothing
- Material: Velvet
- Place of origin: Algeria

The Ghlila is a traditional Algerian jacket originating from Algeria, it is a trapezoidal jacket in velvet or brocade with a deep oval neckline, decorative buttons and enriched with embroidery notably featuring golden threads.

One of the earliest references to the Ghlila was by Diego De Haëdo who recorded his observations during his time in Algiers from 1578 to 1581. Diego de Haëdo gave a description of women wearing voluminous blouses and long cossacks which he had identified as “goleyla” (Ghlila). De Haëdo described the Ghlila as being made from velvet, satin or damask, featuring a wide neckline secured with silver or gold buttons and falling mid-length.

At the beginning of the 19th century the Algerians wore a low cut Ghlila which stopped at the height of the hips consisting of short sleeves, a single button and gold threads. The Ghlila Djabadouli is a Ghlila with long sleeves and it is also worn by men.

The Ghlila was a source for later developments in Algerian fashion as the Karakou descends from it as well as the Caftan of Algiers.

The frimla is a sleeveless cropped variation that originated during the 19th century. It is said to have developed in Algeria before French presence. Descending below the bust it features gold threads and large passementerie buttons.

== See also ==
• Karakou
• Bniqa
• Algerian Kaftan
