= Kaftan =

Traditional elongated cloak-like garment

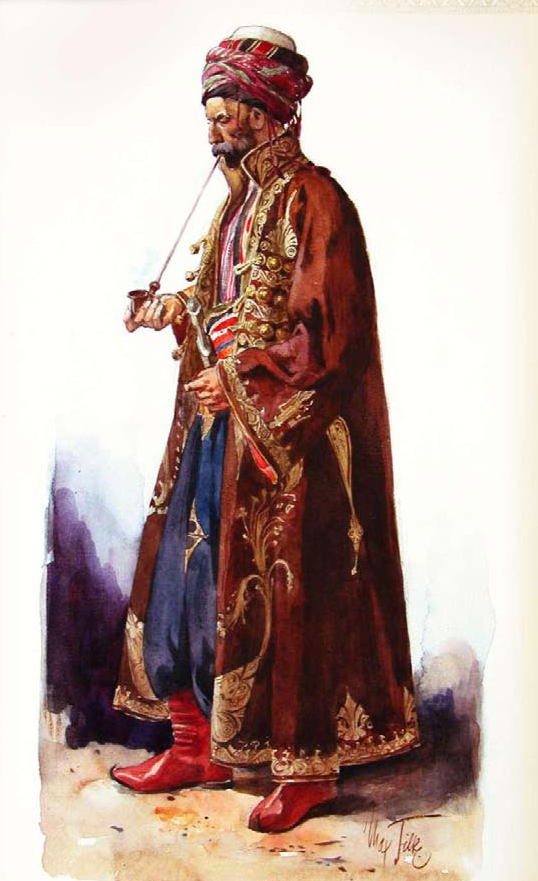
Kurdish man wearing a kaftan. Illustration by Max Karl Tilke published in Oriental Costumes: Their Designs and Colors (1922), Georgian National Museum, Tbilisi.

A kaftan or caftan (/ˈkæftæn/; Arabic: قفطان, qafṭān; Persian: خفتان, khaftān; Turkish: kaftan) is a variant of the robe or tunic. Originating in West Asia, it has been worn by a number of cultures around the world for thousands of years. In Russian usage, kaftan instead refers to a style of men's long suit with tight sleeves.

It may be made of wool, cashmere, silk, or cotton, and may be worn with a sash. Popular during the time of the Ottoman Empire, detailed and elaborately designed garments were given to ambassadors and other important guests at the Topkapı Palace.

Variations of the kaftan were inherited by cultures throughout Asia and were worn by individuals in Russia, the Middle East, and North Africa.

Styles, uses, and names for the kaftan vary from culture to culture. The kaftan is often worn as a coat or as an overdress, usually having long sleeves and reaching to the ankles. In regions with a warm climate, it is worn as a light-weight, loose-fitting garment. In some cultures, the kaftan was a symbol of royalty.

== History ==
Kaftan is described as a long robe as far as the calves sometimes or just under the knee, and is open at the front and the sleeves are slight cut at the wrists or even as far as to the middle of the arms.

The word kaftan is attested in Ottoman Turkish as ḳaftān, denoting a long robe or tunic. The term is generally traced to Persian ḵaftān.

Some linguists, notably Gerhard Doerfer, have argued that the Persian and Arabic form may itself reflect an earlier Turkic loanword. "kap-ton" meaning "bag garment". "Doerfer, Türk. und Mong. Elementen im Neupersisch p. 3:185 , suggesting that the term entered Persian and Arabic from Turkic before spreading more widely.

=== Abbasid era ===
During the Islamic golden age of the Abbasid era, the cosmopolitan super-culture spread far and wide to Chinese emperors, Anglo-Saxon coinage, but also in Constantinople too (current day Istanbul). They were mimicking and imitating Baghdad culture (capital of the Abbasids).

In the 830s, Byzantine Emperor Theophilus, who fought the Abbasids on the battlefield and built a Baghdad-style palace near the Bosporus, went about in kaftans and turbans. Even as far as the streets of Ghuangzhou during the era of Tang dynasty, the Abbasid kaftan was in fashion.

The kaftan became a luxurious fashion, a richly styled robe with buttons down the front. The Caliphs wore elegant kaftans made from silver or gold brocade and buttons in the front of the sleeves. The Caliph al-Muqtaddir (908–932) wore a kaftan from silver brocade Tustari silk and had his son one made from Byzantine silk richly decorated with figures. The kaftan was spread far and wide by the Abbasids and made known throughout the Middle East and North Africa.

== Types ==
=== Turkic kaftan ===
The caftan appears to be the oldest Turkish dress; this costume can be traced as far back as the Hun and Göktürk periods. The kaftan was the favourite garment worn in Turkic states of Central Asia, the Turkic Empire in India, the Seljuk Turks and the Ottomans. It was the most important component of the Seljuk period and the oldest known examples of this robe are said to have been found in Hun tombs. The costume of the Gokturk period consisted of long kaftans that are closed with a belt at the waist, these kaftans can be observed in Gokturk statues.

The Seljuk Sultan Ahmad Sanjar who ruled from 1097 to 1118 gave 1000 red kaftans to his soldiers. In 1058 as well as the period of the Seljuk Sultan Malik-Shah I, the Seljuk Turks wore kaftans and excavations discovered a child's kaftan dating back to the reign of Sanjar-Shah who ruled from 1185 or 1186 to 1187.

The tiles in the Kubadabad Palace depict Turkish figures dressed in kaftans. The palace was built for Sultan Aladdin Kayqubad I who ruled from 1220 to 1237. Furthermore, typical Seljuk depictions from the 11th to the 13th century depict figures dressed in Turkish style kaftans. The kaftan was also worn by the Anatolian Seljuks who had even gifted kaftans to the first Ottoman Sultan, Osman I. In connection with the inheritance of Osman I, the historian Neşri described a kaftan in the list of inherited items: "There was a short-sleeved kaftan of Denizli cloth".

In an excavation in Kinet in Turkey, a bowl dating back to the early 14th century was found with a depiction of a man wearing what appears to be a kaftan.

Kaftans were worn by the sultans of the Ottoman Empire. Decoration on the garment, including colours, patterns, ribbons, and buttons, indicated the rank of the person who wore it. In the first half of the 14th century Orhan Ghazi captured Bursa and made it the Ottoman capital. One of the chief specialties of Bursa was gold embroidery among other weaving related specialties, an archive notes that two kaftans made of the finest Bursa gold-brocaded velvet were prepared for the circumcision of Geliboulu Bey Sinan Pasha's two sons in 1494.

Ibn Battuta who had visited Anatolia witnessed that a mudarris was wearing a gown embroidered with golden pieces and that a Seljuk Bey gifted a kaftan that was embroidered with golden threads. From the 14th century through the 17th century, textiles with large patterns were used. By the late 16th and early 17th centuries, decorative patterns on the fabrics had become smaller and brighter. By the second half of the 17th century, the most precious kaftans were those with yollu: vertical stripes with varying embroidery and small patterns – the so-called "Selimiye" fabrics.

Most fabrics manufactured in Turkey were made in Istanbul and Bursa, but some textiles came from as far away as Venice, Genoa, Persia (Iran), India, and even China. kaftans were made from velvet, aba, bürümcük (a type of crepe with a silk warp and cotton weft), canfes, çatma (a heavy silk brocade), gezi, diba (Persian: دیبا), hatayi, kutnu, kemha, seraser (سراسر) (brocade fabric with silk warp and gold or silver metallic thread weft), serenk, zerbaft (زربافت), and tafta (تافته). Favoured colours were indigo, kermes, violet, pişmiş ayva or "cooked quince", and weld yellow. Silk or wooled vests embellished with couched gold thread or silk embroidery probably represent the introduction of a Turkish feature into an Arab aesthetic.

Nearly 2,500 caftans and other garments belonging to subsequent sultans from the 15th to the 19th century are preserved in the Topkapı Palace museum. The Topkapı Palace houses 21 kaftan that belonged to Mehmed II, 77 kaftan that belonged to Suleiman the Magnificent, 13 that belonged to Ahmed I, 30 that belonged to Osman II and 27 that belonged to Murad IV.

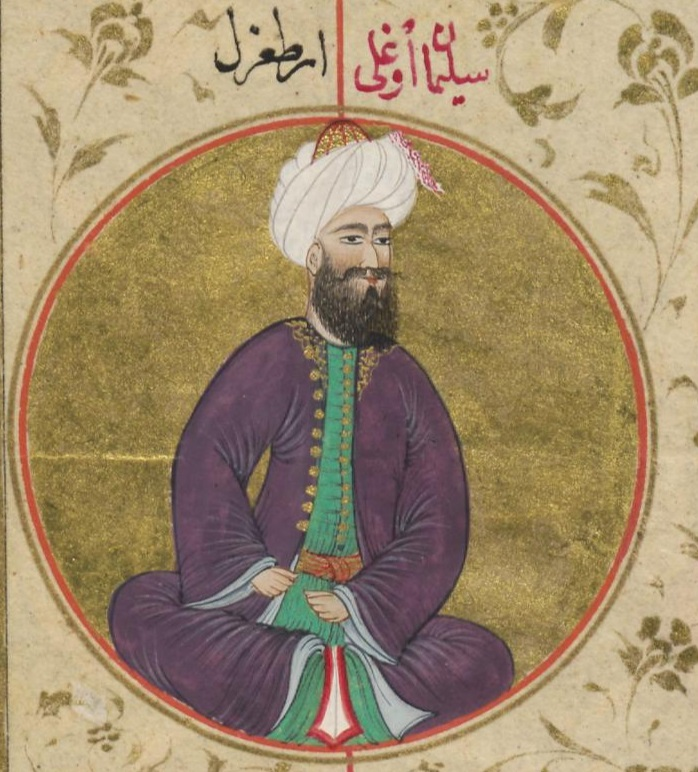
Depiction of Ertugrul wearing a kaftan

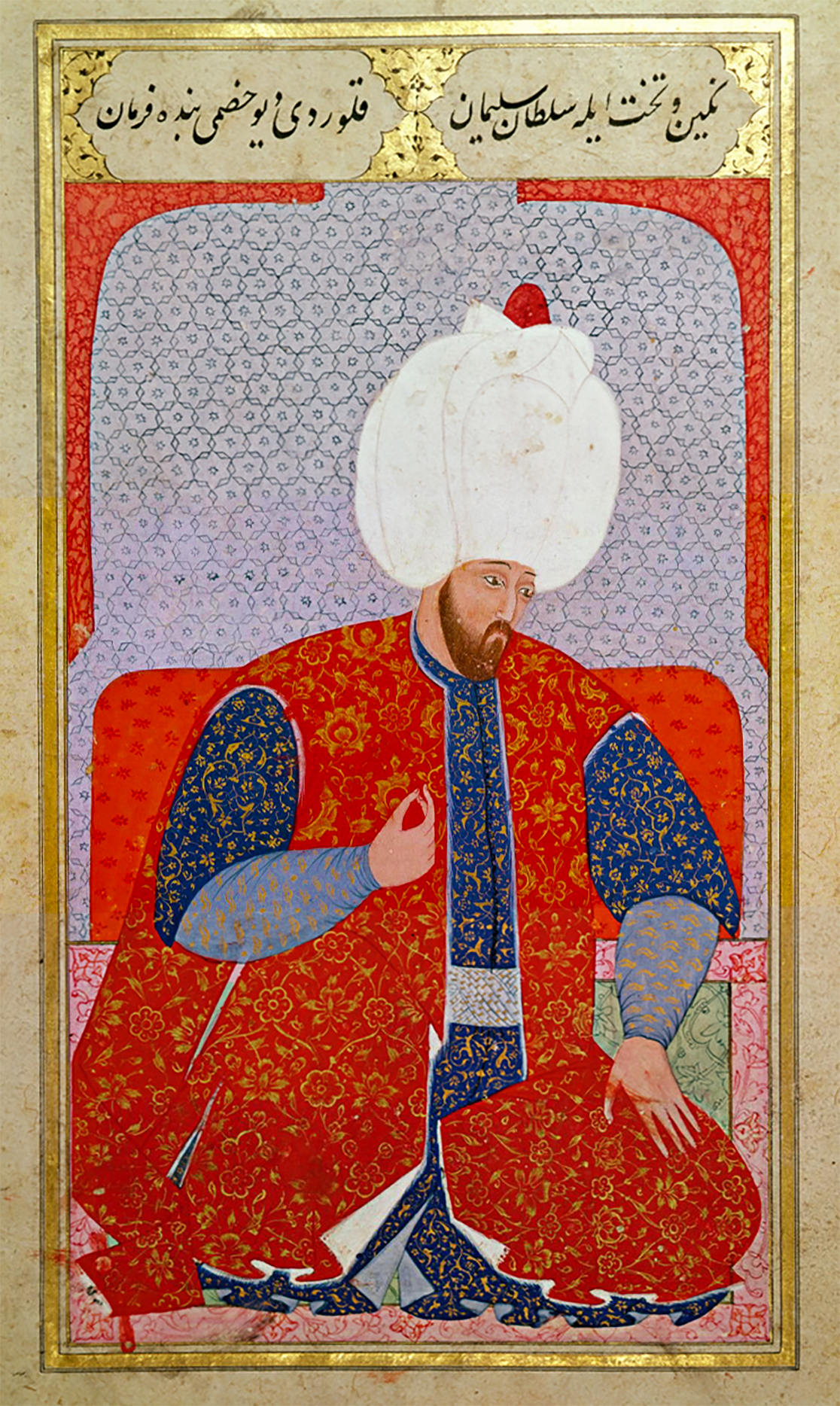
Ottoman Sultan Suleiman the Magnificent in a kaftan of complex woven fabric.

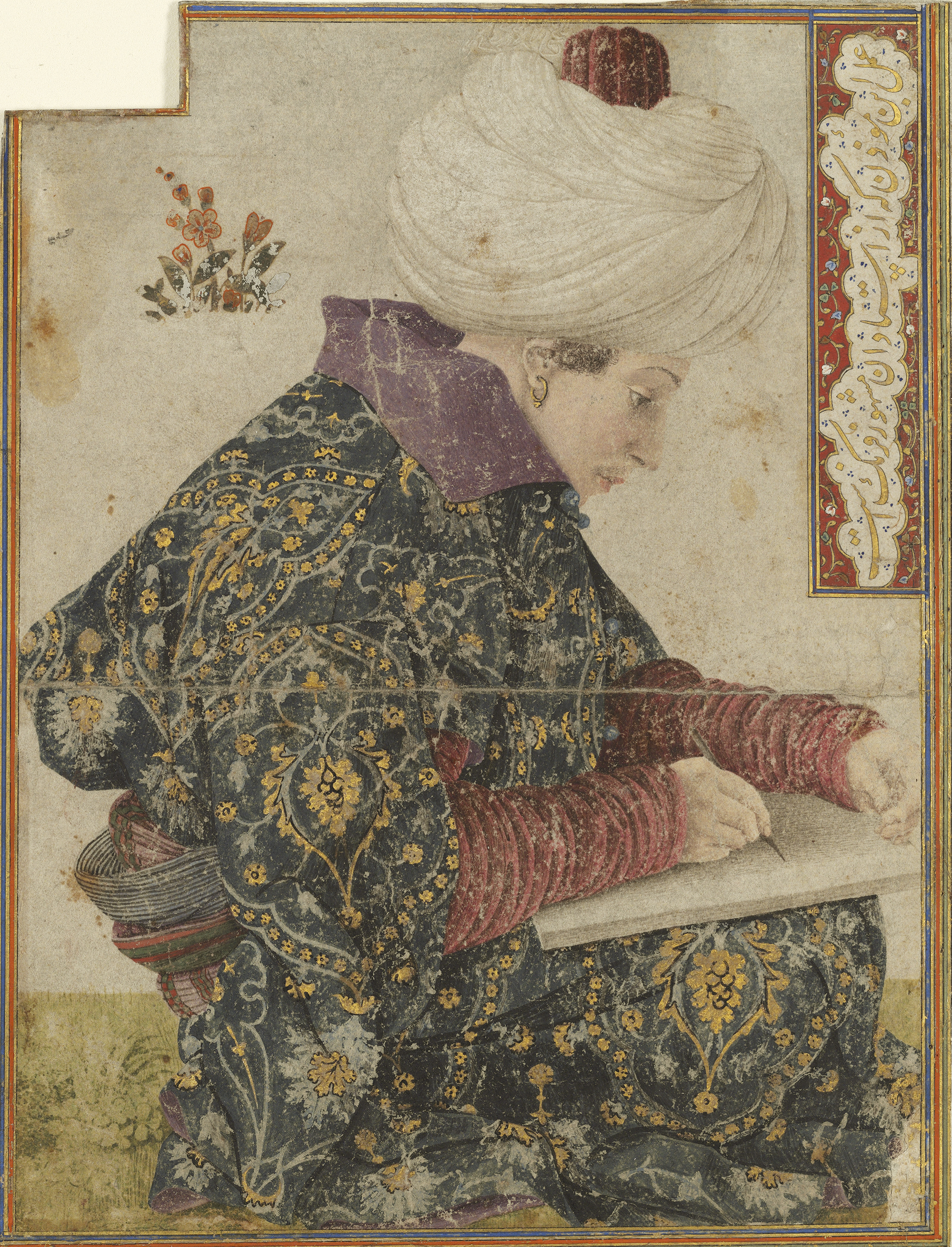
A young member of the Ottoman court dressed in a navy velvet caftan woven with gold. Variously attributed to Gentile Bellini or Costanzo da Ferrara, with a caption in Persian by a later hand. Isabella Stewart Gardner Museum

=== Algerian kaftan ===
Rites and craftsmanship associated with the wedding costume tradition of Tlemcen
- UNESCO Intangible Cultural Heritage
- Country: Algeria
- Reference: 00668
- Region: Arab States

Inscription history
- Inscription: 2012 (7th session)
- List: Representative

The women’s ceremonial costume in the Eastern region of Algeria: knowledge and skills associated with the making and adornment of the Gandoura, the Melehfa, the Caftan, the Quat and the Lhef
- UNESCO Intangible Cultural Heritage
- Country: Algeria
- Reference: 02139
- Region: Arab States

Inscription history
- Inscription: 2024 (19th session)
- List: Representative

The kaftan has been historically documented to have been worn in Algeria in the beginning of the 16th century. Its presence in Algeria dates far back to the Rustamid period, and is also attested during the Zirid period in the 10th century as well as the Zayyanid period in the 13th century. The latter witnessed an important role of the kaftan in the dress culture of the Zayyanid court. The Zayyanid king Abu Hammu Musa II would gift luxurious gold embroidered kaftans to his aides and couriers. In the Zayyanid court wealthy women wore gold embroidered jackets that featured a golden braid and wore a short-sleeved embroidered kaftan over it.

Following the Ottoman tradition, the male kaftan, known as the kaftan of honour, was bestowed by the Ottoman Sultan upon the governors of Algiers who, in turn, bestowed kaftans upon the Beys and members of distinguished families. In his Topography and General History of Algiers, Antonio de Sosa described it as a coloured robe made of satin, of damask, of velvet and silk and having a form that reminded him of the priests' cassocks. The Dey wore the kaftan with dangling sleeves; the khodjas (secretaries) wore a very long cloth based kaftan, falling to the ankles; the chaouchs (executors of the justice of the dey) were recognized by a green kaftan with sleeves either open or closed, according to their rank. The kaftan was also worn by the janissaries in the 17th and part of the 18th century. It continued to be worn by male dignitaries well into the 20th century.

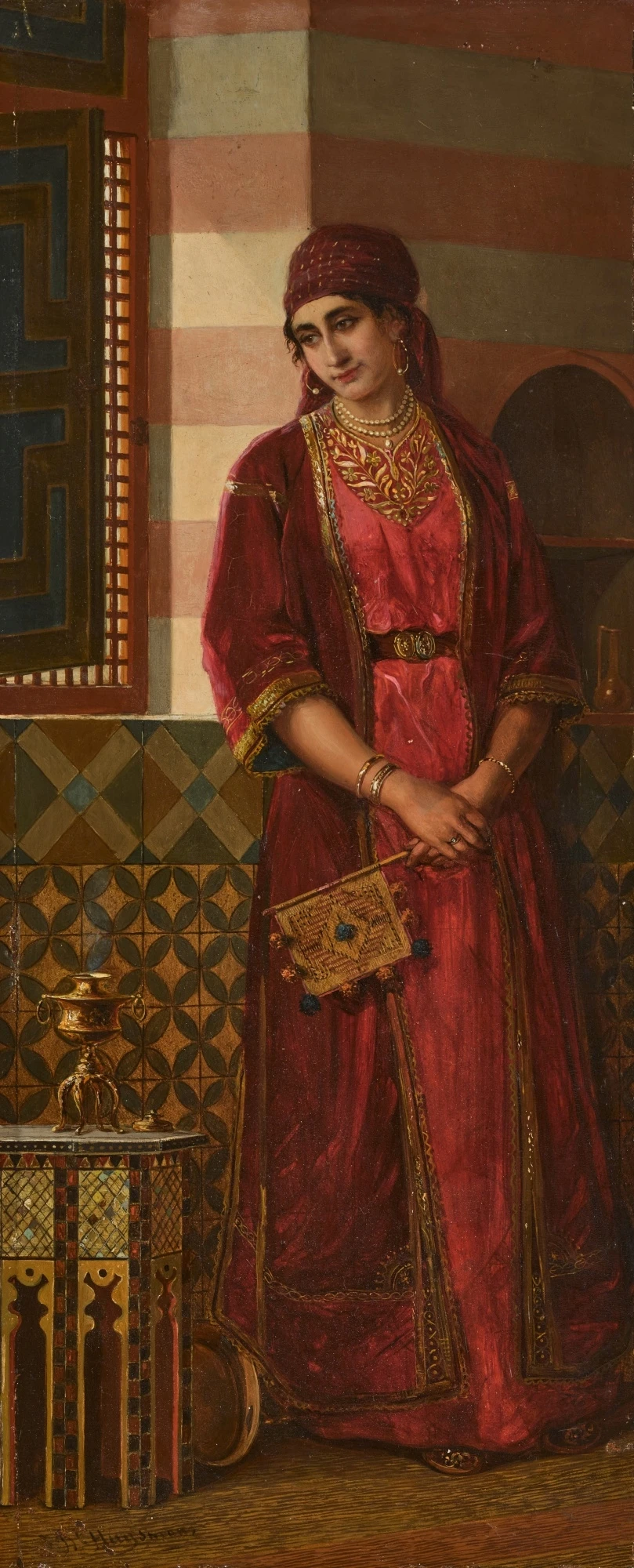
Algerian woman wearing a caftan, by Jan Baptist Huysmans

The female kaftan, on the other hand, evolved locally and derives from the ghlila, a mid-calf jacket that combined Morisco and Ottoman influences, but which evolved following a very specific Algerian style from the sixteenth century onward. Between the sixteenth and seventeenth century, middle-class women started wearing the ghlila. The use of brocades and quality velvet, the profusion of embroidery and gold threading were not enough to satisfy the need for distinction of the wealthiest Algerians who choose to lengthen the ghlila all the way to the ankles to make a kaftan that became the centrepiece of the ceremonial costume, while the ghlila was confined to the role of daily clothing. The introduction of gold thread embroidery into North Africa itself is reputed to have been introduced through Turkish rule.

In the Ottoman era, the textile production significantly contributed to the traditional economy of Ottoman Algeria. Garments such as the kaftan, djabadouli, karakou, djellaba and the burnous were produced. These garments were crafted using bright coloured silk threads or would feature gold or silver embroidery.

In 1789, the diplomat Venture de Paradis described the women of Algiers as follows:

When they go to a party, they put three or four ankle length golden kaftans on top of one another, which, with their other adjustments and gilding, may weigh more than fifty to sixty pounds. These kaftans in velvet, satin or other silks are embroidered in gold or silver thread on the shoulders and on the front, and they have up to the waistband big buttons in gold or silver thread on both sides; they are closed in front by two buttons only.

— Venture de Paradis,

Several types of kaftans were developed since then, while still respecting the original pattern. Nowadays, the Algerian female kaftans, including the modernised versions, are seen as an essential garment in the bride's trousseau in cities such as Algiers, Annaba, Bejaia, Blida, Constantine, Miliana, Nedroma and Tlemcen.

The wedding costume tradition of Tlemcen, known as chedda of Tlemcen, which features an Algerian caftan type from Tlemcen, was inscribed to the Representative List of the Intangible Cultural Heritage of Humanity by UNESCO in 2012, in recognition of its cultural significance.

On December 4, 2024, UNESCO inscribed the ceremonial women's costume of the Eastern region of Algeria: know-how and skills related to the making and ornamentation of the "Gandoura" and the "Melehfa" on its Representative List of the Intangible Cultural Heritage of Humanity. This element concerns the "Communities of seamstresses, embroiderers and jewelers of the eastern departments of the country specializing in the Gandoura, the Melehfa, the Caftan, the Quat, the Lhef and the ceremonial officiants". On December 11, 2025, the title of the element was updated as follows: The ceremonial women's costume of the Eastern region of Algeria: knowledge and skills related to the making and ornamentation of the Gandoura, the Melehfa, the Caftan, the Quat and the Lhef.

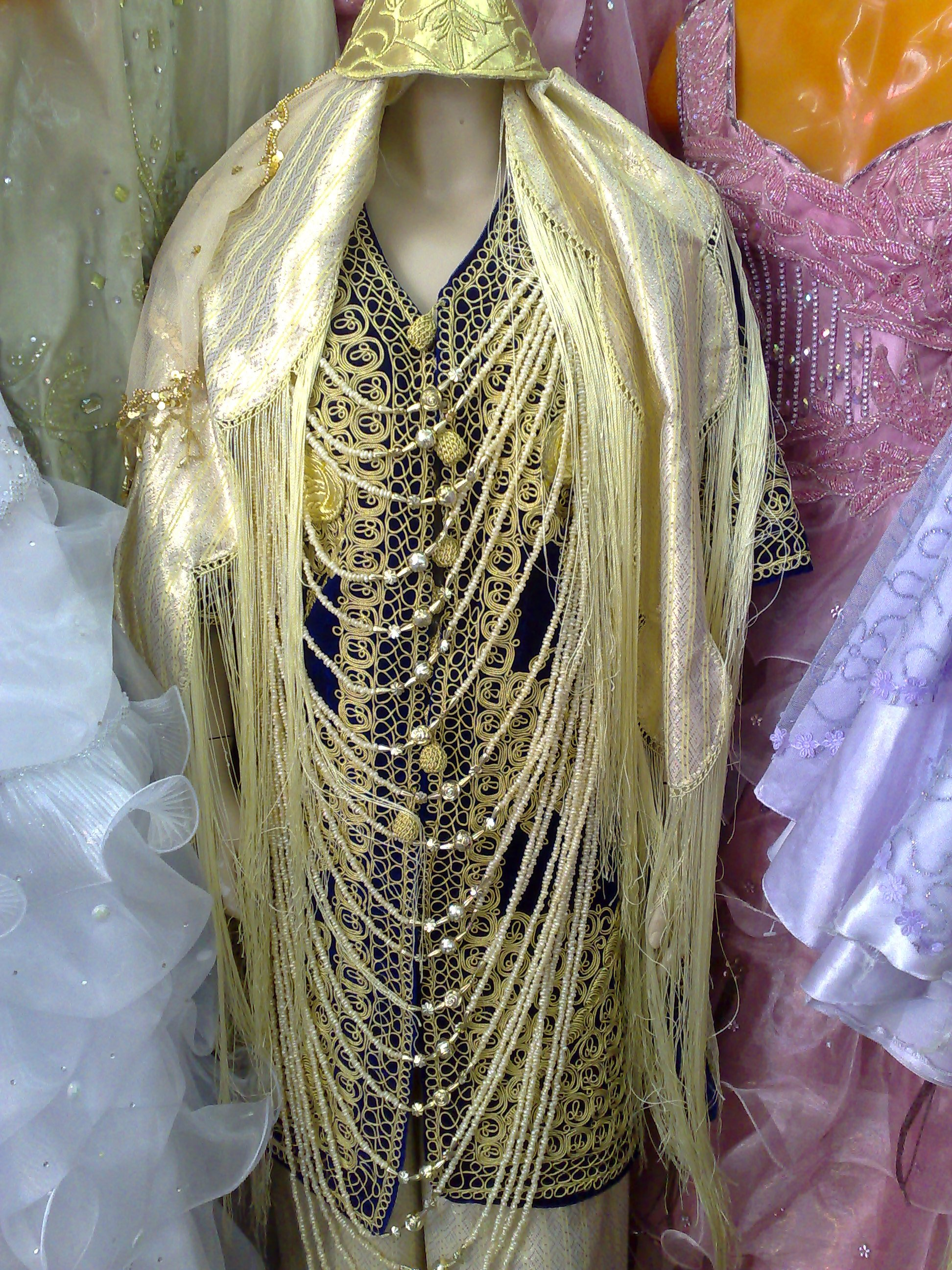
Chedda of Tlemcen, a traditional Algerian caftan from Tlemcen.

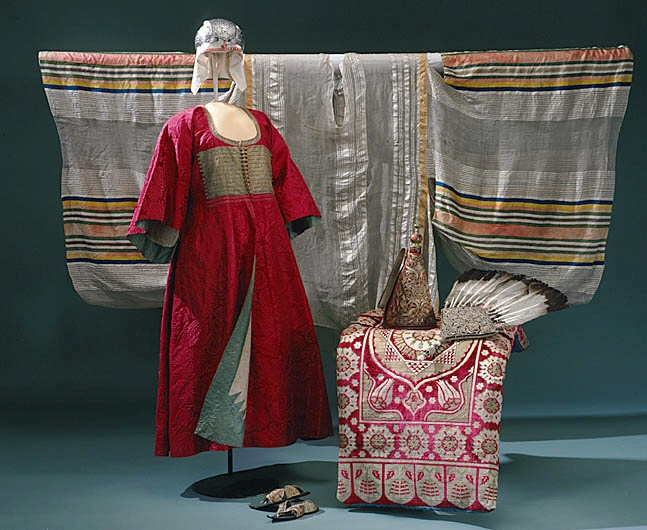
A female caftan offered by Ali Abdi Pacha of Algiers to the crown of Sweden on the occasion of a peace treaty, 1731.

=== Moroccan kaftan ===
Moroccan Caftan: art, traditions and skills
- UNESCO Intangible Cultural Heritage
- Country: Morocco
- Reference: 02077
- Region: Arab States

Inscription history
- Inscription: 2025 (20th session)
- List: Representative

According to the Encyclopaedia of Islam, the kaftan was introduced into the Barbary States by the Ottomans and spread by fashion as far as Morocco.

According to art historian Rachida Alaoui, the kaftan in Morocco dates back to the end of the 15th century and goes back to the region's Moorish history, which represents the medieval heritage of Al-Andalus. However, the first written record of the garment being worn in Morocco is from the 16th century, she states.

According to Naima El Khatib Boujibar, however, the kaftan might only have been introduced to Morocco by the Saadi Sultan Abd al-Malik, who had lived in Algiers and Istanbul. Abd al-Malik, who had officially acknowledged Ottoman overlordship throughout his time as ruler of Morocco, dressed in Ottoman fashion, spoke Turkish, reorganised his army and administration in imitation of Ottoman practices and used Ottoman Turkish titles for his officials. He implemented an Ottomanization policy, dressed himself like an Ottoman and wore Ottoman kaftans, during this period Moroccan society also underwent Ottomanization and it is believed that the Ottoman kaftan entered Morocco as a result of this. The second half of the sixteenth century was a period of Ottoman influence in Morocco during which Ahmad al-Mansur, who was greatly influenced by Ottoman culture, adopted Turkish costumes and customs, he introduced Ottoman fashions of dress, his army adopted Turkish costumes and titles and ambassadors even noted the use of Turkish pottery and Turkish carpets in the Badi Palace. Aspects of Ottoman culture had been introduced to Morocco during the reign of both Abd al-Malik and Ahmad al-Mansur and Abd al-Malik's brief reign opened a period which continued under his successor of the "Turkification" of Morocco. Henri Terrasse asserted that Moroccan embroidery styles are almost all derived from the former regions of the Turkish empire, the introduction of gold thread embroidery into North Africa itself is reputed to have been introduced with Turkish rule.

Worn by the dignitaries and women of the palace at first, it became fashionable among the middle classes from the late 17th century onwards.

Today in Morocco, kaftans are worn by women of different social groups and the word kaftan is commonly used to mean a "one-piece traditional fancy dress". Alternative two-piece versions of Moroccan kaftans are called takchita and worn with a large belt. The takchita is also known as Mansouria which derives from the name of Sultan Ahmad al-Mansur, who invented Al-Mansouria, which likely derived from Ottoman dress, and the new fashion of wearing a two-piece kaftan.

In 2022, the Islamic World Educational, Scientific and Cultural Organization (ICESCO) inscribed the Moroccan caftan and the brocade of Fez on its Islamic World Heritage List. On 10 December 2025, UNESCO inscribed the element "Moroccan Caftan: art, traditions and skills" on its Representative List of the Intangible Cultural Heritage of Humanity as part of Morocco's intangible cultural heritage.

=== West African kaftan ===
In West Africa, a kaftan is a pullover robe, worn by both men and women. The women's robe is called a kaftan, and the men's garment is referred to as a Senegalese kaftan.

A Senegalese kaftan is a pullover men's robe with long bell-like sleeves. In the Wolof language, this robe is called a mbubb and in French, it is called a boubou. The Senegalese kaftan is an ankle-length garment, and is worn with matching drawstring pants called tubay. Usually made of cotton brocade, lace, or synthetic fabrics, these robes are common throughout West Africa. A kaftan and matching pants are called a kaftan suit. The kaftan suit is worn with a kufi cap. Senegalese kaftans are formal wear in all West African countries.

=== Persian ===
Persian kaftan robes of honour were commonly known as khalat or kelat.

=== North Asia and Eastern Europe ===
==== Russian ====
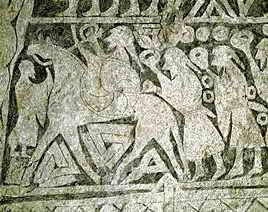
Gotlandic picture stone showing men in kaftan-like attire

In Russia, there was a lagre variety of styles of kaftans for virtuall al strata of society.

The Russian kaftan was probably influenced by Persian and/or Turkic people in Old Russia. The word "kaftan" was adopted from the Tatar language. In the 13th century, the kaftan was still common in Russia. In the 19th century, Russian kaftans were the most widespread type of outer-clothing amongst peasants and merchants in Old Russia. Currently in the early 21st century, they are most commonly used as ritual religious clothing by conservative Old Believers, Russian folk dress and with regards to Russian folklore.

==== Jewish ====
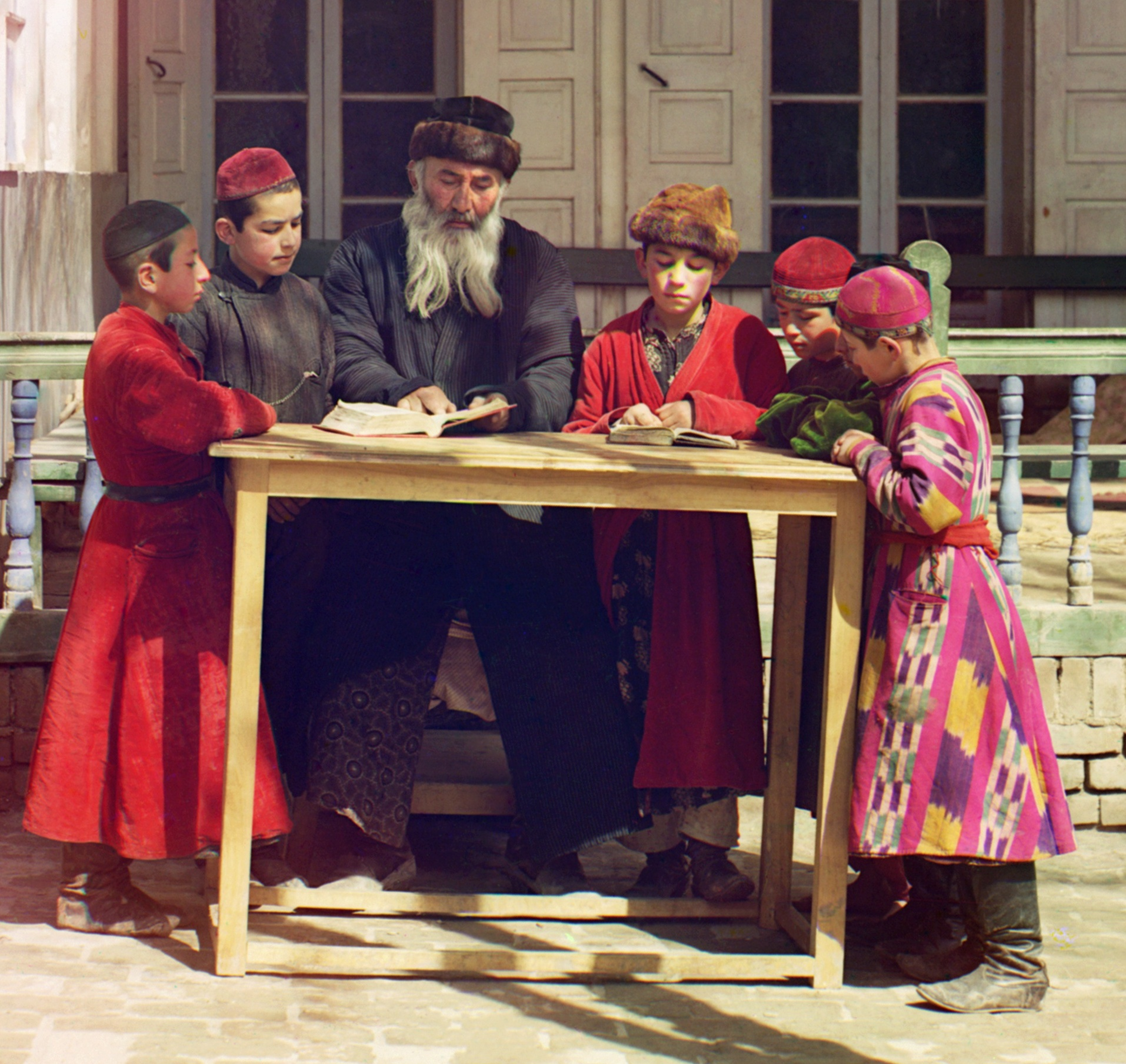
Jewish children with a school teacher in Samarkand, wearing kaftans (circa 1910).

Hasidic Jewish culture adapted a silky robe (bekishe) or frock coat (kapoteh, Yiddish word kapote or Turkish synonym chalat) from the garb of Polish nobility, which was itself a type of kaftan. The term kapoteh may originate from the Spanish capote or possibly from "kaftan" via Ladino. Sephardic Jews from Muslim countries wore a kaftan similar to those of their neighbours.

=== Southeast Asian ===
In Southeast Asia, the kaftan was originally worn by Arab traders, as seen in early lithographs and photographs from the region. Religious communities that formed as Islam became established later adopted this style of dress as a distinguishing feature, under a variety of names deriving from Arabic and Persian such as "jubah", a robe, and "cadar", a veil or chador.

=== Europe and United States ===
Americans returning from journeys on the hippie trail helped popularise the kaftan.

In the recent era the kaftan was introduced to the West in the 1890s, Queen Victoria's granddaughter Alix of Hesse wore a traditional Russian coronation dress before a crowd which included Western on-lookers, this traditional dress featured the loose-fitting Russian kaftan which was so exotic to Western eyes. This was one of the first times a Western woman, a high-status Western woman who had also been seen in fashionable Western dress no less, was seen wearing something so exotic. The traditional Russian kaftan resembles the kaftans worn by the Ottoman sultans; it was in stark contrast to the tight-fitting, corseted dresses common in England at that time.

The kaftan slowly gained popularity as an exotic form of loose-fitting clothing. French fashion designer Paul Poiret further popularized this style in the early 20th century.

In the 1950s, fashion designers such as Christian Dior and Balenciaga adopted the kaftan as a loose evening gown or robe in their collections. These variations were usually sashless. This style had also began appearing as high fashion.

American hippie fashions of the late 1960s and the 1970s often drew inspiration from ethnic styles, including kaftans for women and men. These styles were brought to the United States by people who journeyed the so-called "hippie trail". African-styled, kaftan-like dashikis were popular, especially among African-Americans. Street styles were appropriated by fashion designers, who marketed lavish kaftans as hostess gowns for casual at-home entertaining. The popularity of Kaftans went high in mass market and their cheap imports. Given the materials and the style of the Kaftan, it has shown to symbolize serving as royalty. The types of forms of dresses and kaftans were among the rich.

Diana Vreeland, Babe Paley, and Barbara Hutton all helped popularize the kaftan in mainstream western fashion. Into the 1970s, Elizabeth Taylor often wore kaftans designed by Thea Porter. In 1975, for her second wedding to Richard Burton she wore a kaftan designed by Gina Fratini.

More recently, in 2011 Jessica Simpson was photographed wearing kaftans during her pregnancy. American fashion editor André Leon Talley also wore kaftans designed by Ralph Rucci as one of his signature looks. Beyoncé, Uma Thurman, Susan Sarandon, Kate Moss, Mary-Kate and Ashley Olsen, and Nicole Richie have all been seen wearing the style. Some fashion lines have dedicated collections to the kaftan.

== Gallery ==
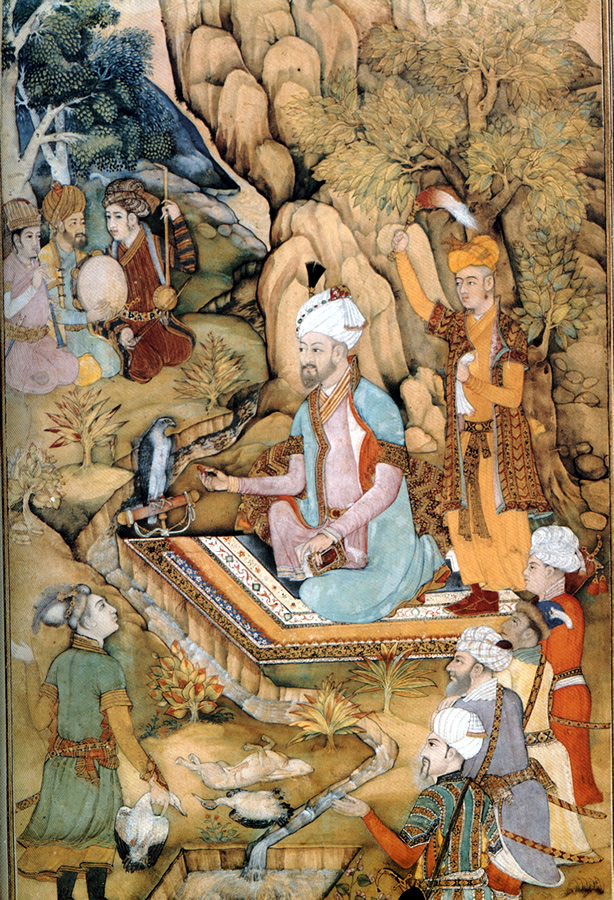
The first Mughal Emperor Babur dressed in a kaftan.

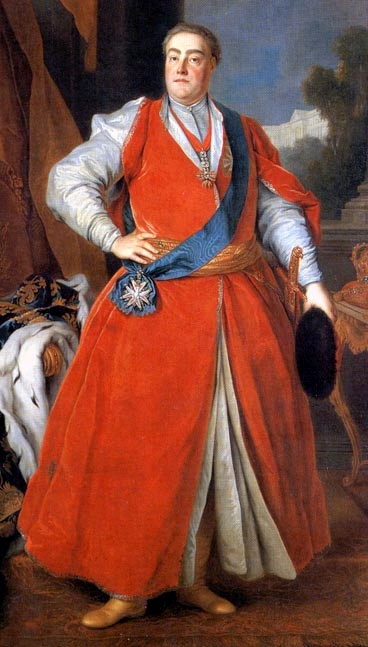
August III the Saxon in żupan, by Louis de Silvestre.

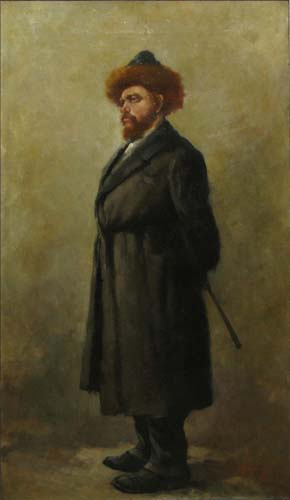
Evreu cu caftan (Jew in kaftan) by Nicolae Grigorescu.

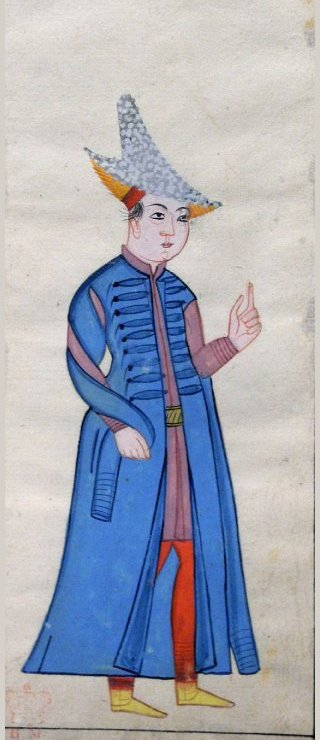
An Armenian youth 'out of Persia' who wears a pale blue kaftan. Ottoman Turkish Illustrations from Peter Mundy's Album, Istanbul 1618.

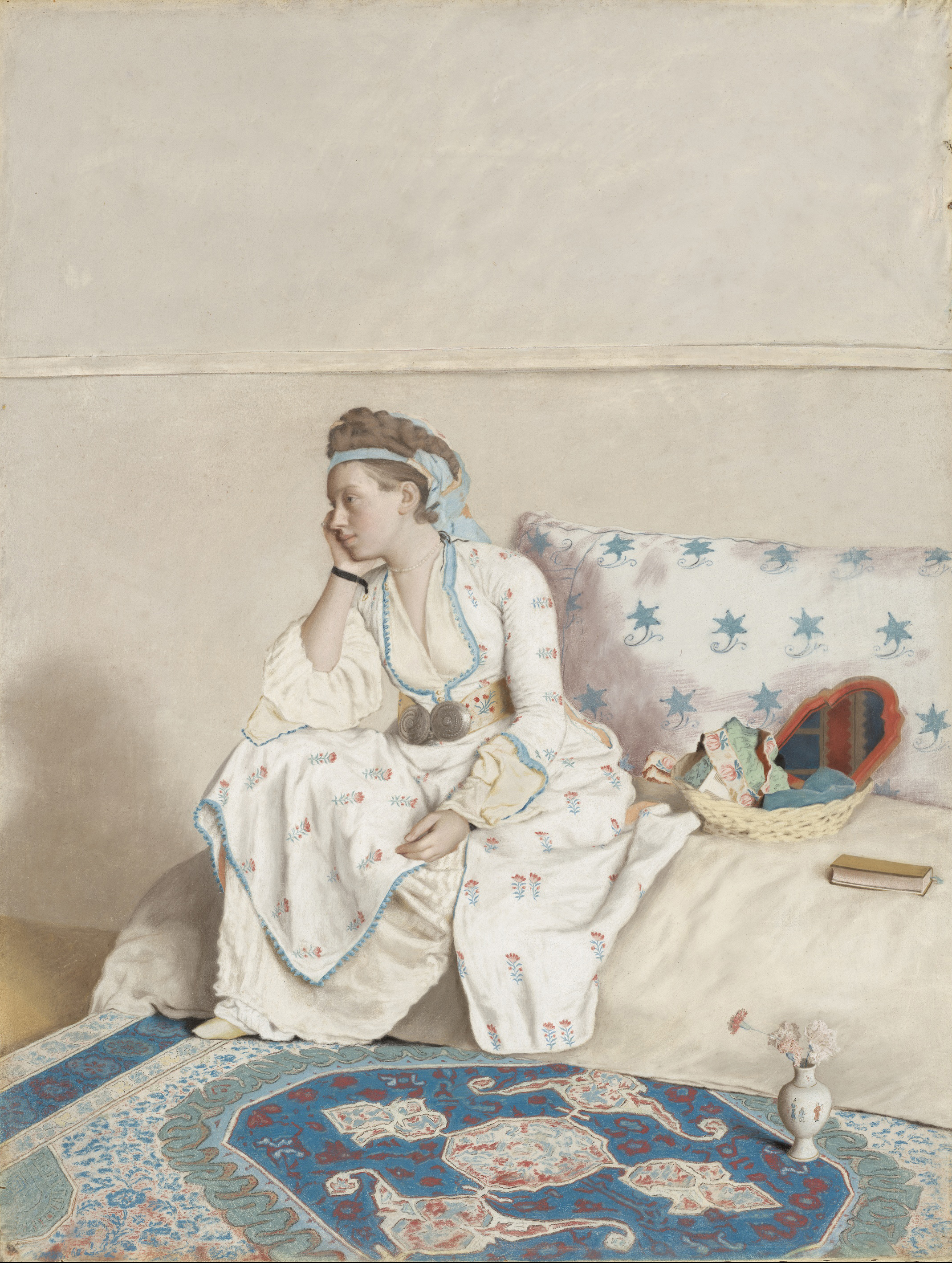
Portrait of the artist's wife, Marie Fargues, in a kaftan, by Jean-Étienne Liotard.

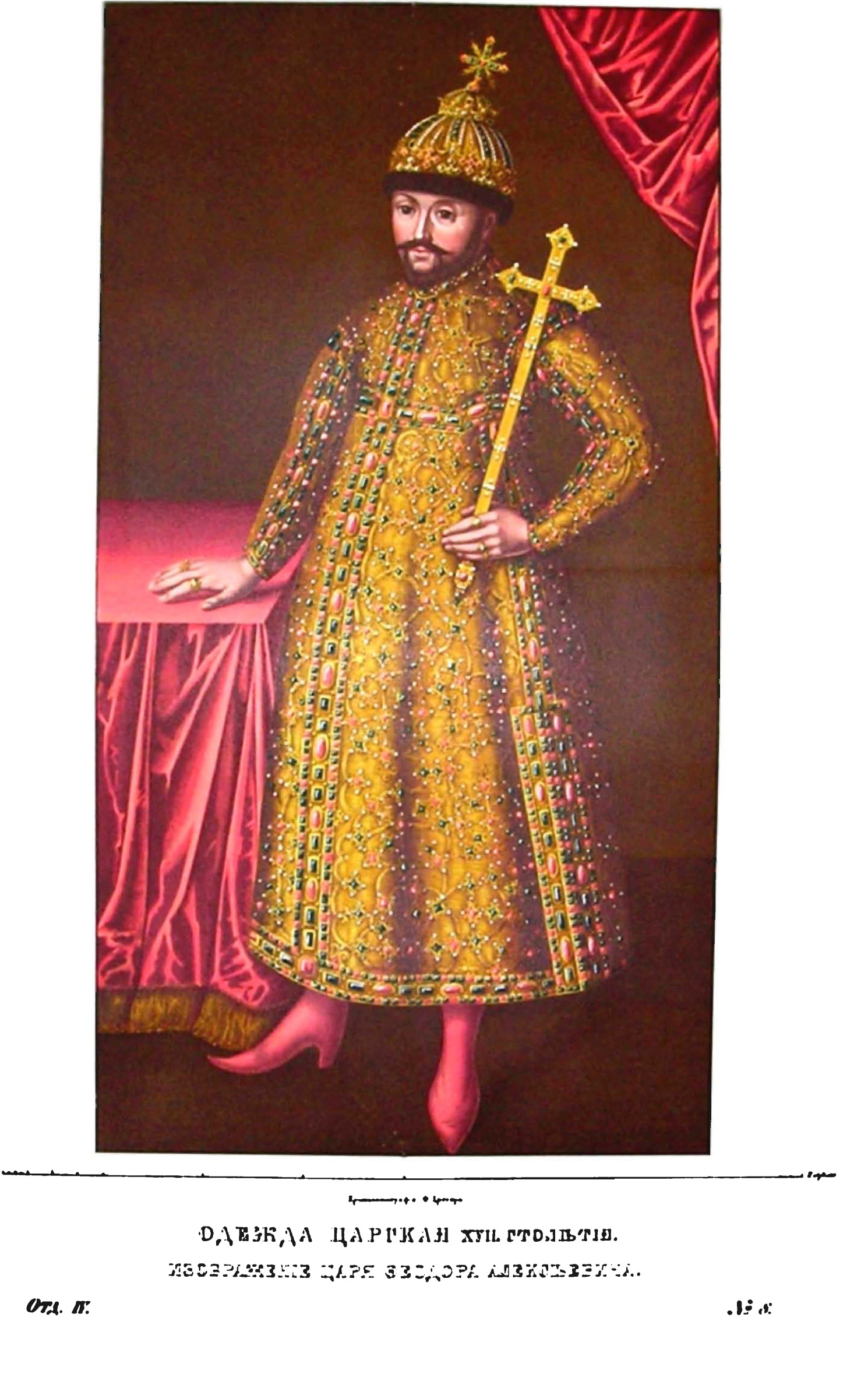
Tzar Feodor I wearing a kaftan. Antiquities of the Russian country 1846–1853, Solntsev, Fedor Grigorievich.

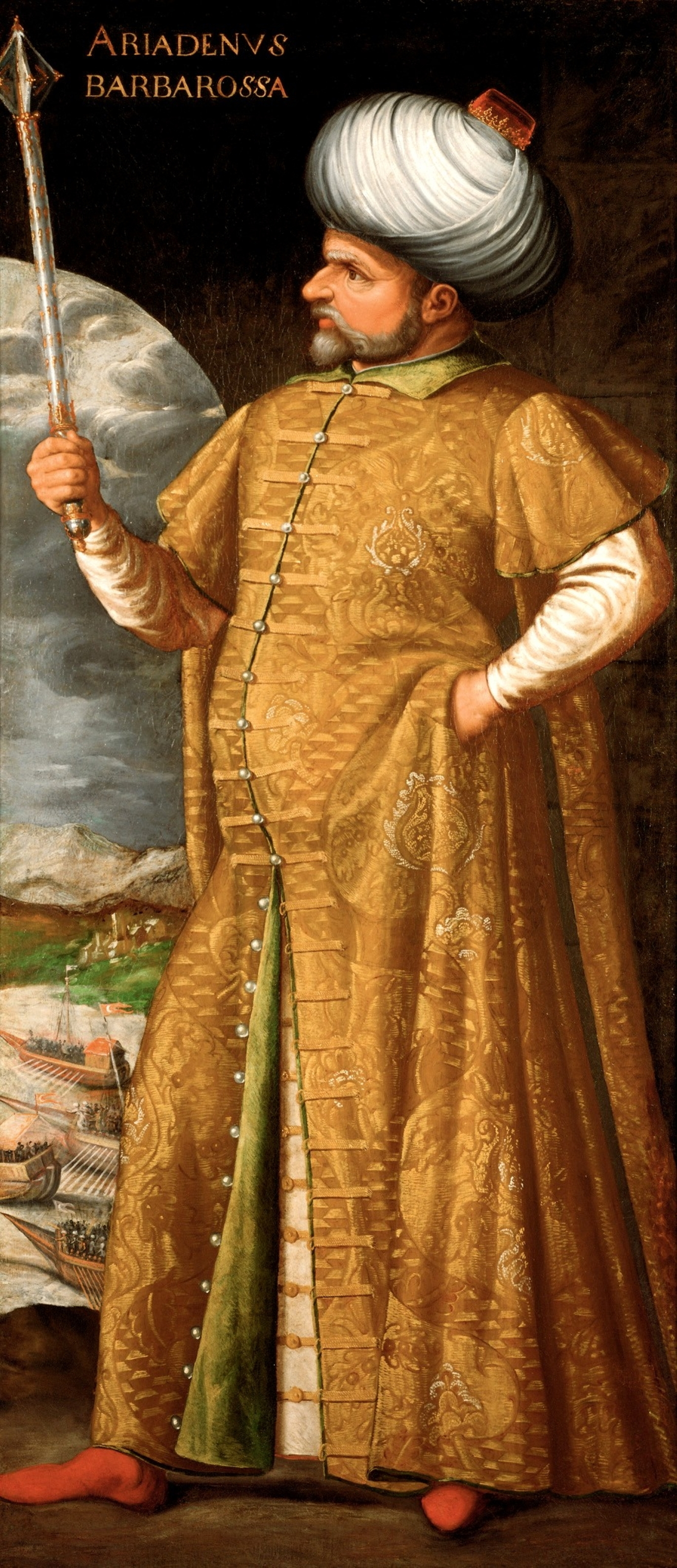
Hayreddin Barbarossa, Barbary corsair, Beylerbey of Algiers and Kapudan Pasha (Grand Admiral) of the navy of the Ottoman Empire, wearing a caftan.

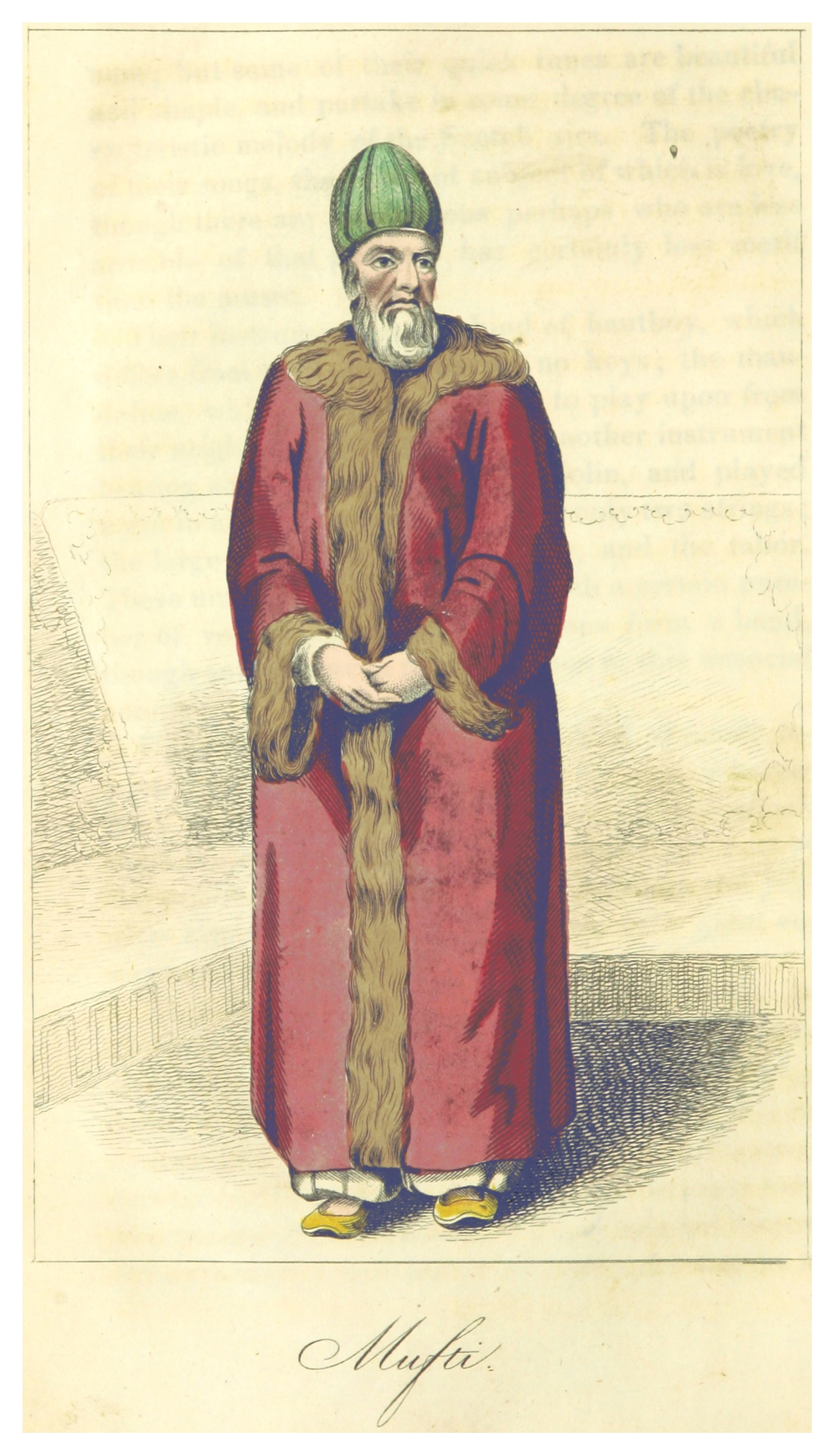
Mufti of Algiers wearing what appears to be crimson kaftan in 1817, British Library.

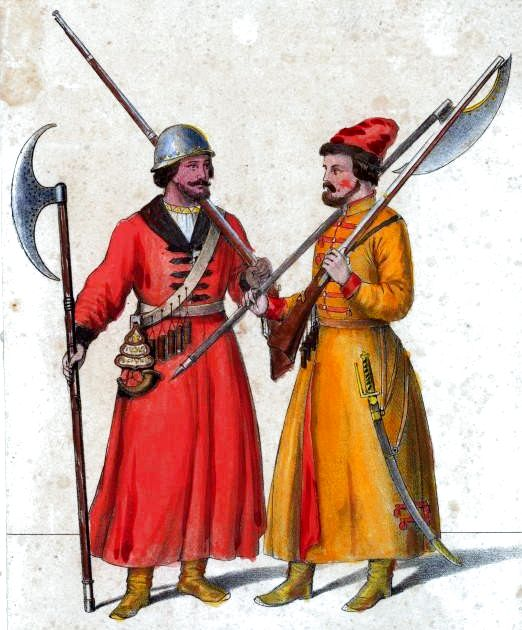
Streltsy (warriors in Russia from 16th to the early 18th centuries) wearing kaftans. Painted in 19th century.

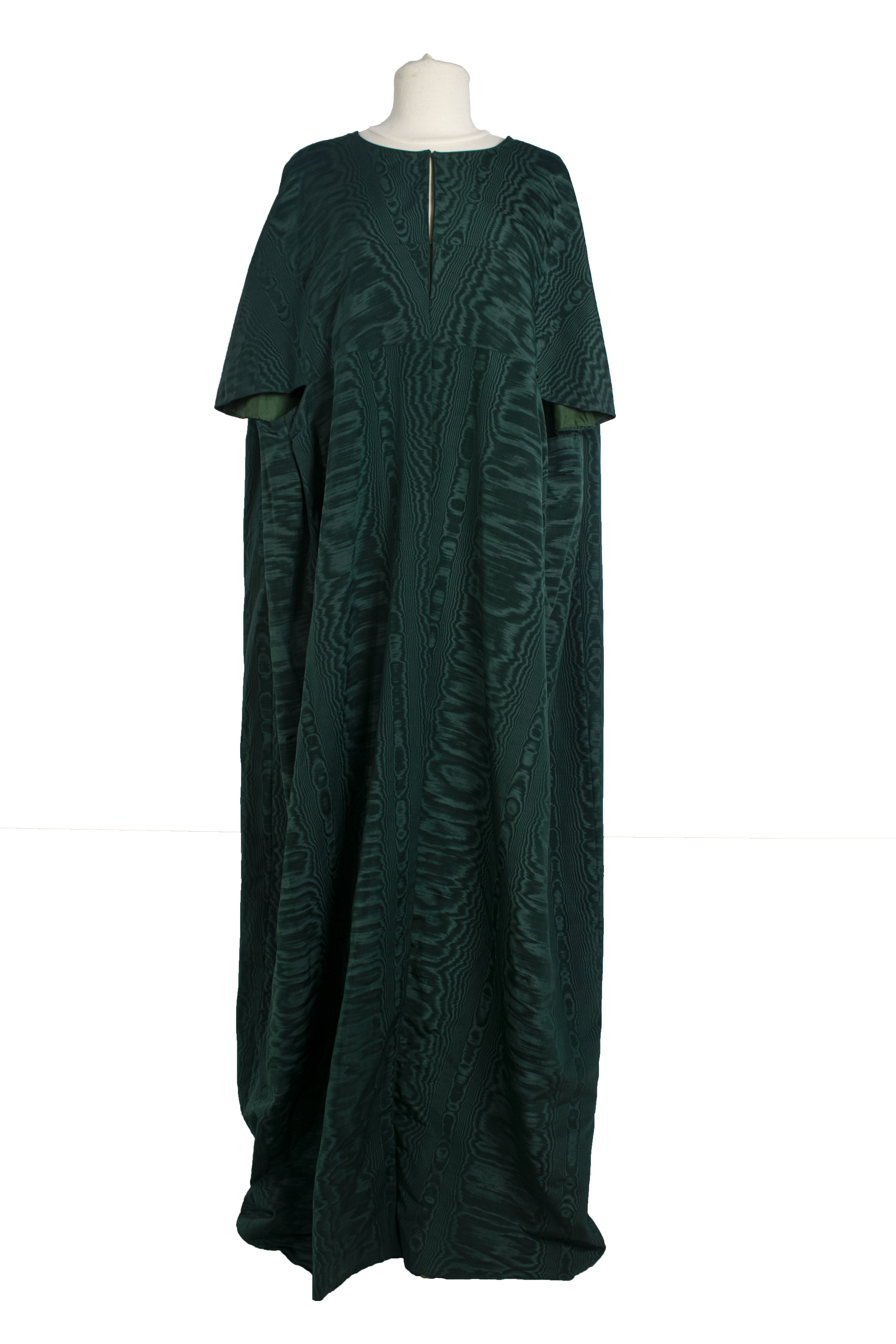
Green kaftan designed by Sybil Connolly (1970s)

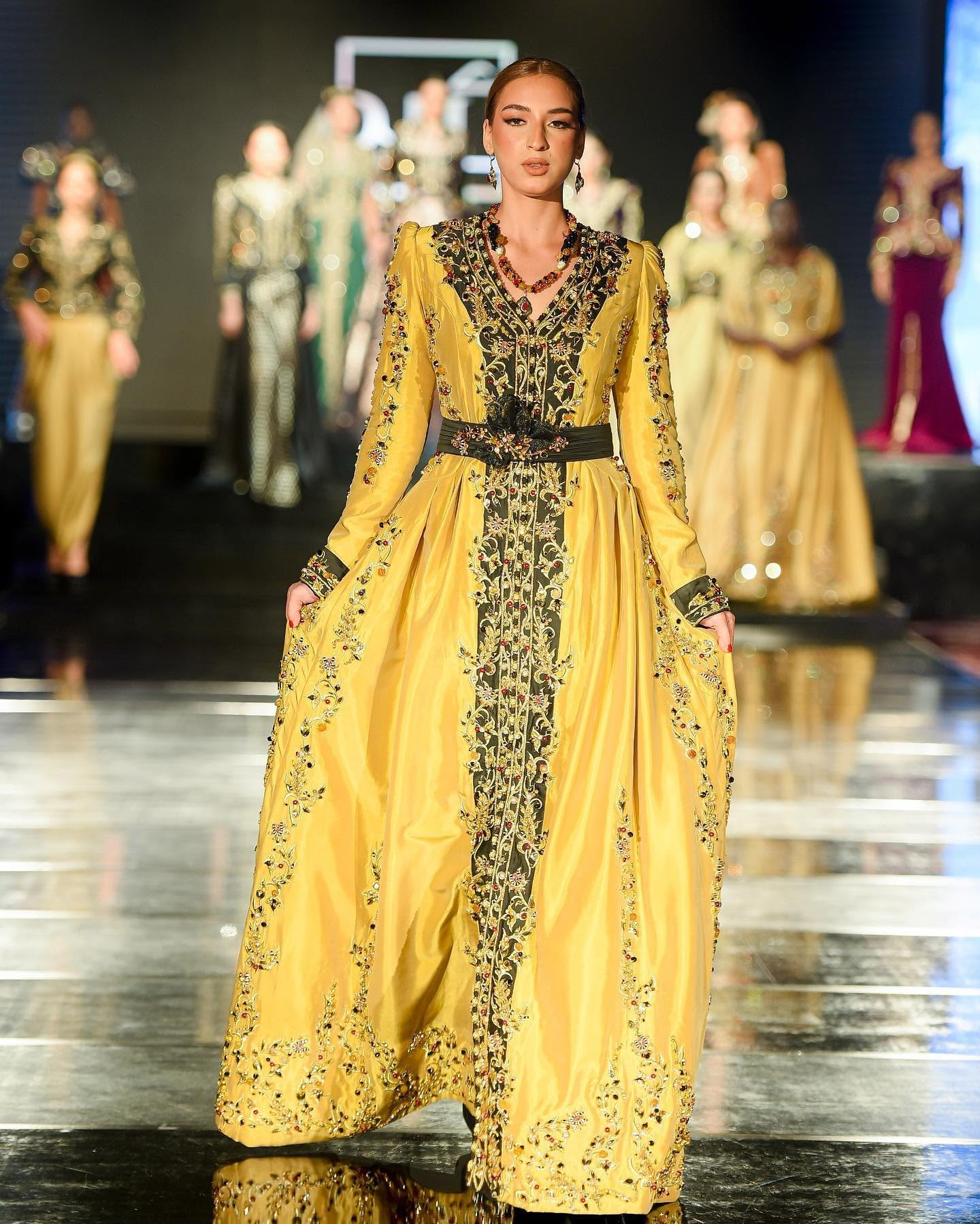
Algerian caftan at the ifaegypt of the 2023 by Karim Akrouf.

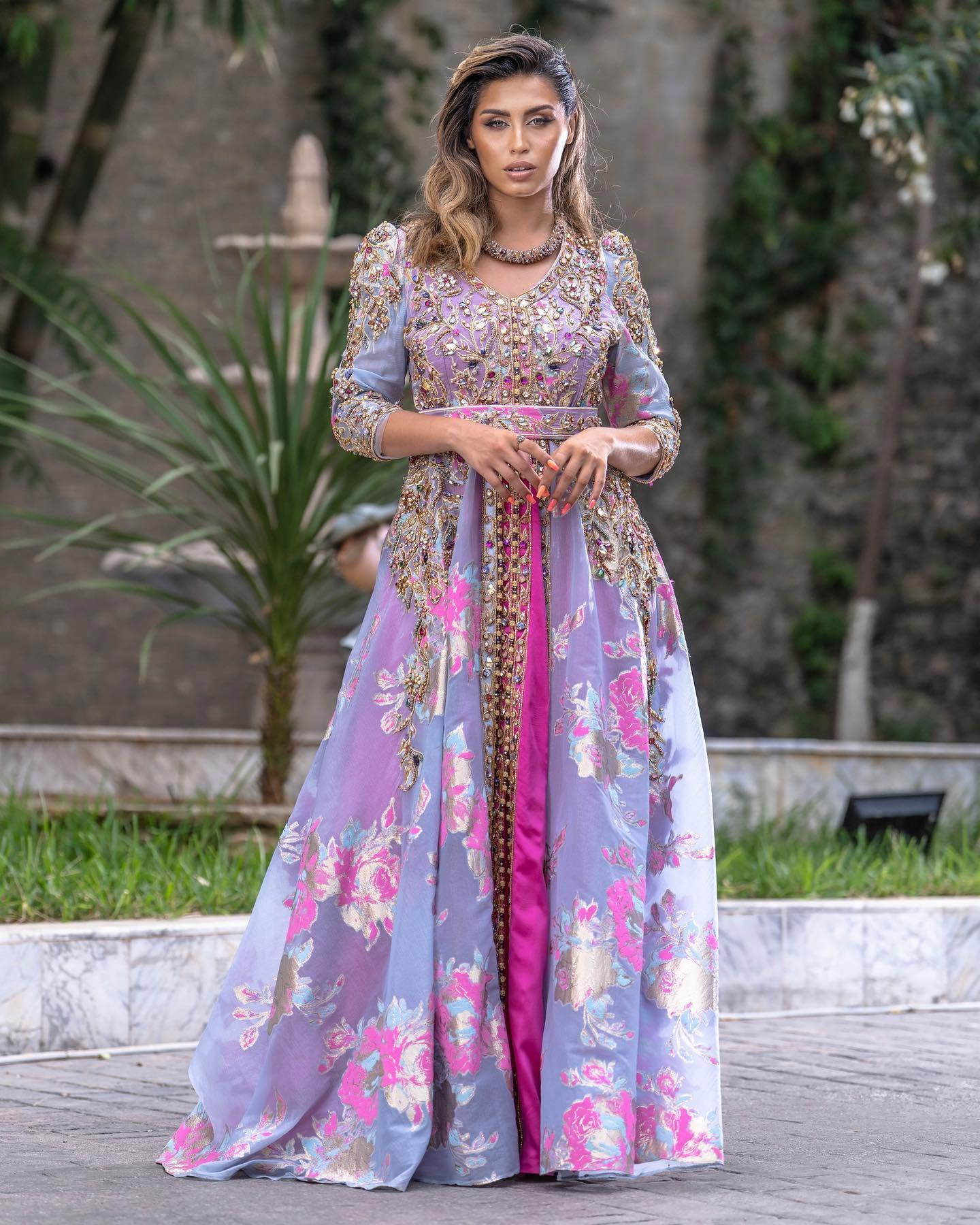
Royal algerian caftan of 2023 by Karim Akrouf.

== See also ==
- Caftan Show
- Chapan
- Deel (clothing)
- Kanzu
- Kufi
- Ottoman clothing
- Takchita
- Thawb
- Wrapper (clothing)
